= Cloud =

Visible mass of particles suspended in the atmosphere

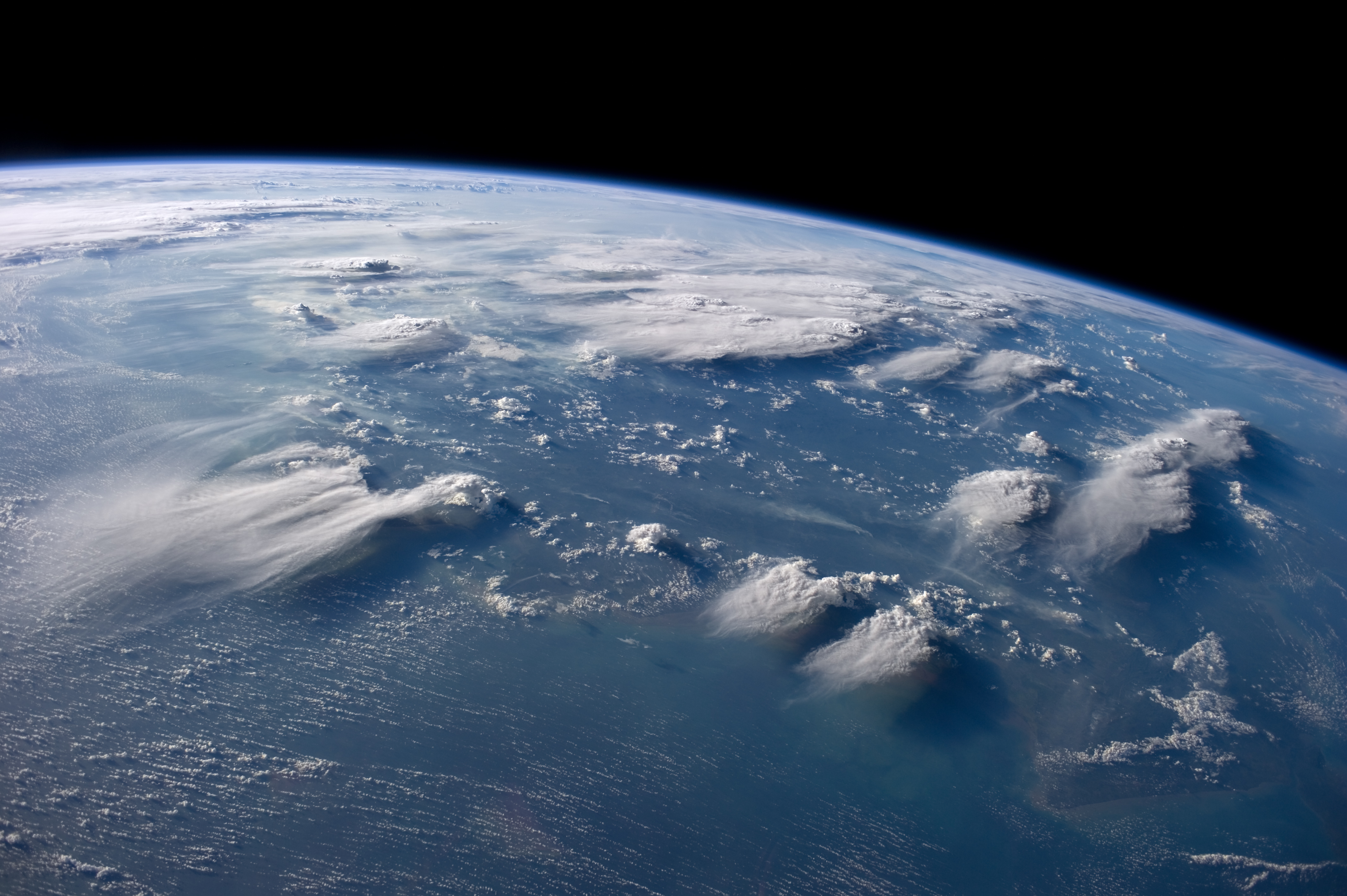
Cloudscape over Borneo, taken by the International Space Station

In meteorology, a cloud is an aerosol consisting of a visible mass of miniature liquid droplets, ice crystals, or other particles, suspended in the atmosphere of a planetary body or similar space. Water, primarily, comprises the droplets and crystals. On Earth, clouds are formed as a result of saturation of the air when it is cooled to its dew point, or when it gains sufficient moisture, usually in the form of water vapor, from an adjacent source to raise the dew point to the ambient temperature.

Clouds are seen in the Earth's homosphere, which includes the troposphere, stratosphere, and mesosphere. Nephology is the science of clouds, which is undertaken in the cloud physics branch of meteorology. The World Meteorological Organization uses two methods of naming clouds in their respective layers of the homosphere, Latin and common name.

Genus types in the troposphere, the atmospheric layer closest to Earth's surface, have Latin names because of the universal adoption of Luke Howard's nomenclature that was formally proposed in 1802. It became the basis of a modern international system that divides clouds into five physical forms which can be further divided or classified into altitude levels to derive ten basic genera. The five main forms are stratiform sheets or veils, cumuliform heaps, stratocumuliform bands, rolls, or ripples, cumulonimbiform towers often with fibrous tops, and cirriform wisps or patches. Low-level clouds do not have any altitude-related prefixes. However mid-level stratiform and stratocumuliform types are given the prefix alto- while high-level variants of these same two forms carry the prefix cirro-. In the case of stratocumuliform clouds, the prefix strato- is applied to the low-level genus type but is dropped from the mid- and high-level variants to avoid double-prefixing with alto- and cirro-. Genus types with sufficient vertical extent to occupy more than one level do not carry any altitude-related prefixes. They are classified formally as low- or mid-level depending on the altitude at which each initially forms, and are also more informally characterized as multi-level or vertical. Most of the ten genera derived by this method of classification can be subdivided into species and further subdivided into varieties. Very low stratiform clouds that extend down to the Earth's surface are given the common names fog and mist but have no Latin names.

In the stratosphere and mesosphere, clouds also have common names for their main types. They may have the appearance of veils or sheets, wisps, or bands or ripples, but not heaps or towers as in the troposphere. They are seen infrequently, mostly in the polar regions of Earth. Clouds have been observed in the atmospheres of other planets and moons in the Solar System and beyond. However, due to their different temperature characteristics, they are often composed of other substances such as methane, ammonia, and sulfuric acid, as well as water.

Tropospheric clouds can have a direct effect on climate change on Earth. They may reflect incoming rays from the Sun which can contribute to a cooling effect where and when these clouds occur, or trap longer wave radiation that reflects up from the Earth's surface which can cause a warming effect. The altitude, form, and thickness of the clouds are the main factors that affect the local heating or cooling of the Earth and the atmosphere. Clouds that form above the troposphere are too scarce and too thin to have any influence on climate change. Clouds are the main uncertainty in climate sensitivity.

== Etymology ==
The origin of the term "cloud" can be found in the Old English words clud or clod, meaning a hill or a mass of stone. Around the beginning of the 13th century, the word came to be used as a metaphor for rain clouds, because of the similarity in appearance between a mass of rock and cumulus heap cloud. Over time, the metaphoric usage of the word supplanted the Old English weolcan, which had been the literal term for clouds in general.

== Homospheric nomenclatures and cross-classification ==
The table that follows is very broad in scope like the cloud genera template upon which it is partly based. There are some variations in styles of nomenclature between the classification scheme used for the troposphere (strict Latin except for surface-based aerosols) and the method used for the higher levels of the homosphere (common terms, some informally derived from Latin). However, these two schemes, both of which are authorized and used by the World Meteorological Organization, share a cross-classification of physical forms and altitude levels to derive the 10 tropospheric genera, the fog and mist that forms at surface level, and several additional major types above the troposphere. The cumulus genus includes four species that indicate vertical size which can affect the altitude levels.

Form Level	Stratiform non-convective	Cirriform mostly non-convective	Stratocumuliform limited-convective	Cumuliform free-convective	Cumulonimbiform strong-convective
Extreme-level	Noctilucent veils	Noctilucent billows or whirls	Noctilucent bands		
Very high-level	Nitric acid and water PSC veils	Cirriform nacreous PSC	Lenticular nacreous PSC		
High-level	Cirrostratus	Cirrus	Cirrocumulus		
Mid-level	Altostratus		Altocumulus		
Towering vertical				Cumulus congestus	Cumulonimbus
Multi-level or moderate vertical	Nimbostratus			Cumulus mediocris	
Low-level	Stratus		Stratocumulus	Cumulus humilis or fractus	
Surface-level	Fog or mist				

== History of cloud science ==
Ancient cloud studies were not made in isolation, but were observed in combination with other weather elements and even other natural sciences. Around 340 BC, Greek philosopher Aristotle wrote Meteorologica, a work which represented the sum of knowledge of the time about natural science, including weather and climate. For the first time, precipitation and the clouds from which precipitation fell were called meteors, which originate from the Greek word meteoros, meaning 'high in the sky'. From that word came the modern term meteorology, the study of clouds and weather. Meteorologica was based on intuition and simple observation, but not on what is now considered the scientific method. Nevertheless, it was the first known work that attempted to treat a broad range of meteorological topics in a systematic way, especially the hydrological cycle.

Tropospheric cloud classification by altitude of occurrence. Multi-level and vertical genus-types are not limited to a single altitude level; these include nimbostratus, cumulonimbus, and some of the larger cumulus species.

After centuries of speculative theories about the formation and behavior of clouds, the first truly scientific studies were undertaken at the beginning of the 19th century by Luke Howard in England and Jean-Baptiste Lamarck in France. Howard was a methodical observer with a strong grounding in the Latin language, and used his background to formally classify the various tropospheric cloud types during 1802. He believed that scientific observations of the changing cloud forms in the sky could unlock the key to weather forecasting.

Lamarck had worked independently on cloud classification the same year and had come up with a different naming scheme that failed to make an impression even in his home country of France because it used unusually descriptive and informal French names and phrases for cloud types. His system of nomenclature included 12 categories of clouds, with such names as (translated from French) hazy clouds, dappled clouds, and broom-like clouds. By contrast, Howard used universally accepted Latin, which caught on quickly after it was published in 1803. As a sign of the popularity of the naming scheme, German dramatist and poet Johann Wolfgang von Goethe composed four poems about clouds, dedicating them to Howard.

An elaboration of Howard's system was eventually formally adopted by the International Meteorological Conference in 1891. This system covered only the tropospheric cloud types. However, the discovery of clouds above the troposphere during the late 19th century eventually led to the creation of separate classification schemes that reverted to the use of descriptive common names and phrases that somewhat recalled Lamarck's methods of classification. These very high clouds, although classified by these different methods, are nevertheless broadly similar to some cloud forms identified in the troposphere with Latin names.

== Formation ==
Terrestrial clouds can be found throughout most of the homosphere, which includes the troposphere, stratosphere, and mesosphere. Within these layers of the atmosphere, air can become saturated as a result of being cooled to its dew point or by having moisture added from an adjacent source. In the latter case, saturation occurs when the dew point is raised to the ambient air temperature.

=== Adiabatic cooling ===
Adiabatic cooling occurs when one or more of three possible lifting agents – convective, cyclonic/frontal, or orographic – cause a parcel of air containing invisible water vapor to rise and cool to its dew point, the temperature at which the air becomes saturated. The main mechanism behind this process is adiabatic cooling. As the air is cooled to its dew point and becomes saturated, water vapor normally condenses to form cloud drops. This condensation normally occurs on cloud condensation nuclei such as salt or dust particles that are small enough to be held aloft by normal circulation of the air.

Animation of cloud evolution from cumulus humilis to cumulonimbus capillatus incus

One agent is the convective upward motion of air caused by daytime solar heating at surface level. Low level airmass instability allows for the formation of cumuliform clouds in the troposphere that can produce showers if the air is sufficiently moist. On moderately rare occasions, convective lift can be powerful enough to penetrate the tropopause and push the cloud top into the stratosphere.

Frontal and cyclonic lift occur in the troposphere when stable air is forced aloft at weather fronts and around centers of low pressure by a process called convergence. Warm fronts associated with extratropical cyclones tend to generate mostly cirriform and stratiform clouds over a wide area unless the approaching warm airmass is unstable, in which case cumulus congestus or cumulonimbus clouds are usually embedded in the main precipitating cloud layer. Cold fronts are usually faster moving and generate a narrower line of clouds, which are mostly stratocumuliform, cumuliform, or cumulonimbiform depending on the stability of the warm airmass just ahead of the front.

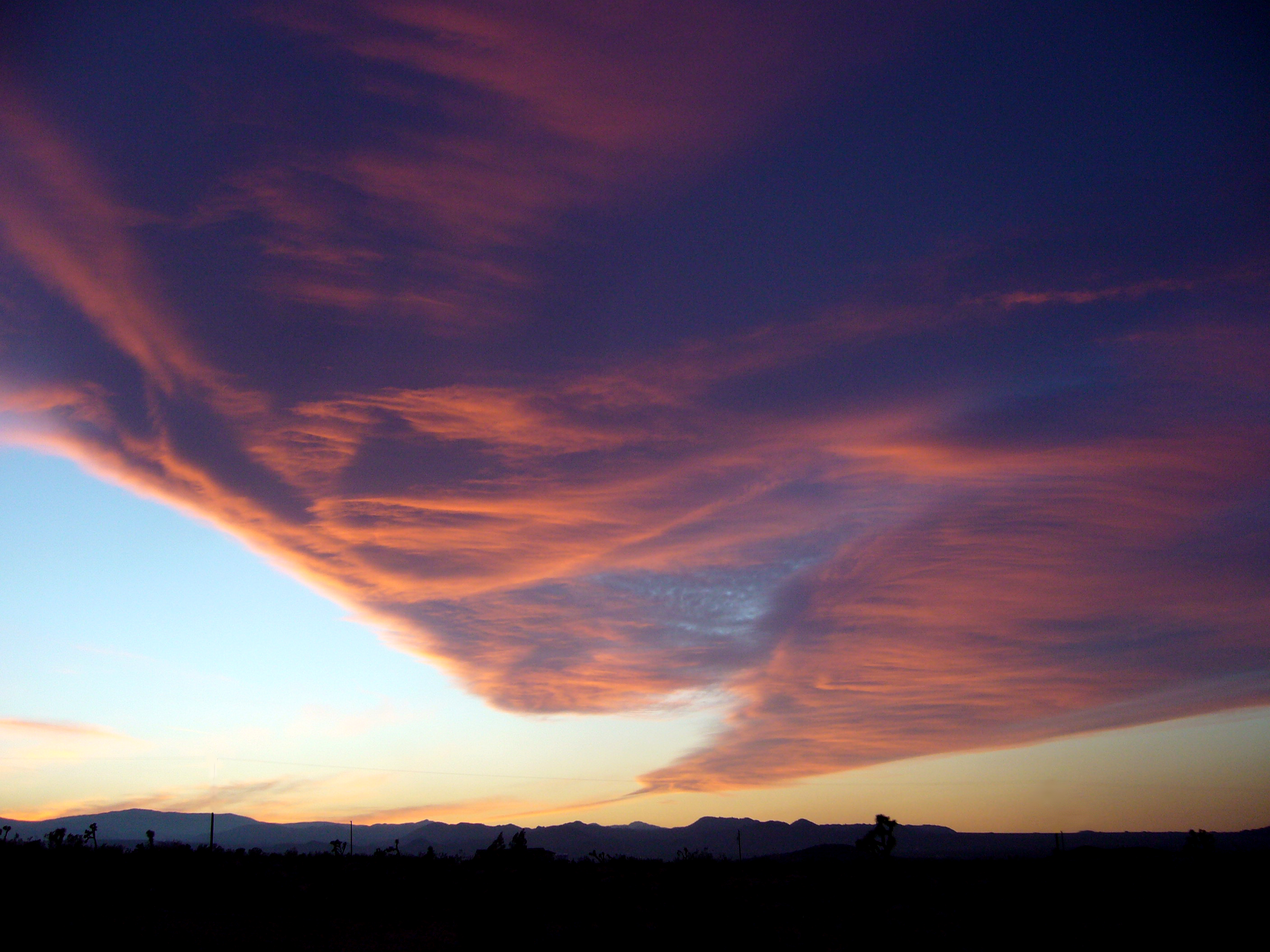
Windy evening twilight enhanced by the Sun's angle. Clouds can visually mimic a tornado resulting from orographic lift.

A third source of lift is wind circulation forcing air over a physical barrier such as a mountain (orographic lift). If the air is generally stable, nothing more than lenticular cap clouds form. However, if the air becomes sufficiently moist and unstable, orographic showers or thunderstorms may appear.

Clouds formed by any of these lifting agents are initially seen in the troposphere where these agents are most active. However, water vapor that has been lifted to the top of troposphere can be carried even higher by gravity waves where further condensation can result in the formation of clouds in the stratosphere and mesosphere.

=== Non-adiabatic cooling ===
Along with adiabatic cooling that requires a lifting agent, three major nonadiabatic mechanisms exist for lowering the temperature of the air to its dew point. Conductive, radiational, and evaporative cooling require no lifting mechanism and can cause condensation at surface level resulting in the formation of fog.

=== Adding moisture to the air ===
Several main sources of water vapor can be added to the air as a way of achieving saturation without any cooling process: evaporation from surface water or moist ground, precipitation or virga, and transpiration from plants.

== Tropospheric classification ==
Classification in the troposphere is based on a hierarchy of categories with physical forms and altitude levels at the top. These are cross-classified into a total of ten genus types, most of which can be divided into species and further subdivided into varieties which are at the bottom of the hierarchy.

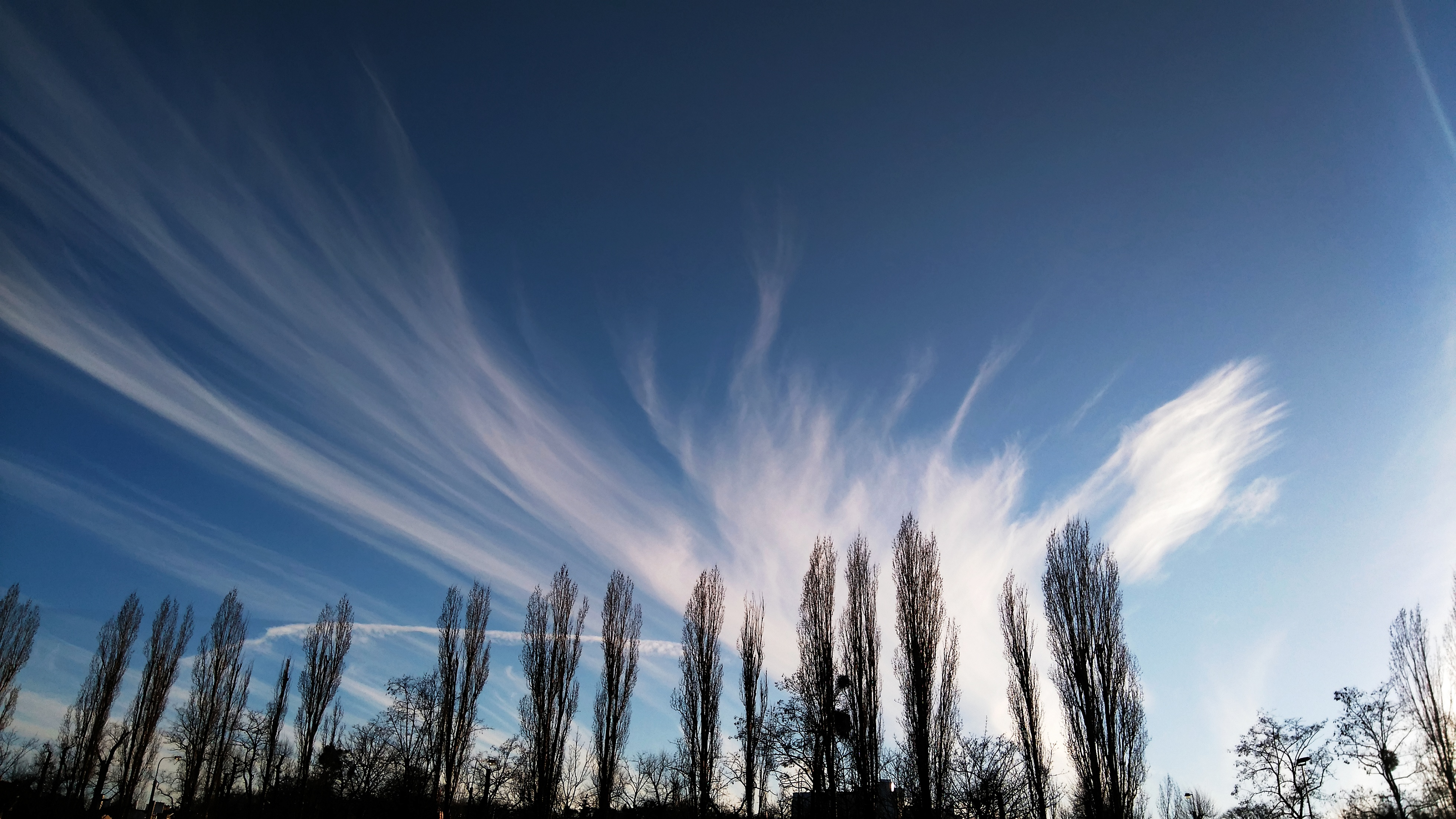
Cirrus fibratus clouds in March

Clouds in the troposphere assume five physical forms based on structure and process of formation. These forms are commonly used for the purpose of satellite analysis. They are given below in approximate ascending order of instability or convective activity.

- Nonconvective stratiform clouds appear in stable airmass conditions and, in general, have flat, sheet-like structures that can form at any altitude in the troposphere. The stratiform group is divided by altitude range into the genera cirrostratus (high-level), altostratus (mid-level), stratus (low-level), and nimbostratus (multi-level). Fog is commonly considered a surface-based cloud layer. The fog may form at surface level in clear air or it may be the result of a very low stratus cloud subsiding to ground or sea level. Conversely, low stratiform clouds result when advection fog is lifted above surface level during breezy conditions.
- Cirriform clouds in the troposphere are of the genus cirrus and have the appearance of detached or semi-merged filaments. They form at high tropospheric altitudes in air that is mostly stable with little or no convective activity, although denser patches may occasionally show buildups caused by limited high-level convection where the air is partly unstable. Clouds resembling cirrus, cirrostratus, and cirrocumulus can be found above the troposphere but are classified separately using common names.
- Stratocumuliform clouds both cumuliform and stratiform characteristics in the form of rolls, ripples, or elements. They generally form as a result of limited convection in an otherwise mostly stable airmass topped by an inversion layer. If the inversion layer is absent or higher in the troposphere, increased airmass instability may cause the cloud layers to develop tops in the form of turrets consisting of embedded cumuliform buildups. The stratocumuliform group is divided into cirrocumulus (high-level, strato- prefix dropped), altocumulus (mid-level, strato- prefix dropped), and stratocumulus (low-level).
- Cumuliform clouds generally appear in isolated heaps or tufts. They are the product of localized but generally free-convective lift where no inversion layers are in the troposphere to limit vertical growth. In general, small cumuliform clouds tend to indicate comparatively weak instability. Larger cumuliform types are a sign of greater atmospheric instability and convective activity. Depending on their vertical size, clouds of the cumulus genus type may be low-level or multi-level with moderate to towering vertical extent.
- Cumulonimbus clouds are largest free-convective clouds, which has a towering vertical extent. They occur in highly unstable air and often have fuzzy outlines at the upper parts of the clouds that sometimes include anvil tops. These clouds are the product of very strong convection that can penetrate the lower stratosphere.

=== Levels and genera ===
Tropospheric clouds form in any of three levels (formerly called étages) based on altitude range above the Earth's surface. The grouping of clouds into levels is commonly done for the purposes of cloud atlases, surface weather observations, and weather maps. The base-height range for each level varies depending on the latitudinal geographical zone. Each altitude level comprises two or three genus-types differentiated mainly by physical form.

The standard levels and genus-types are summarised below in approximate descending order of the altitude at which each is normally based. Multi-level clouds with significant vertical extent are separately listed and summarized in approximate ascending order of instability or convective activity.

==== High-level ====
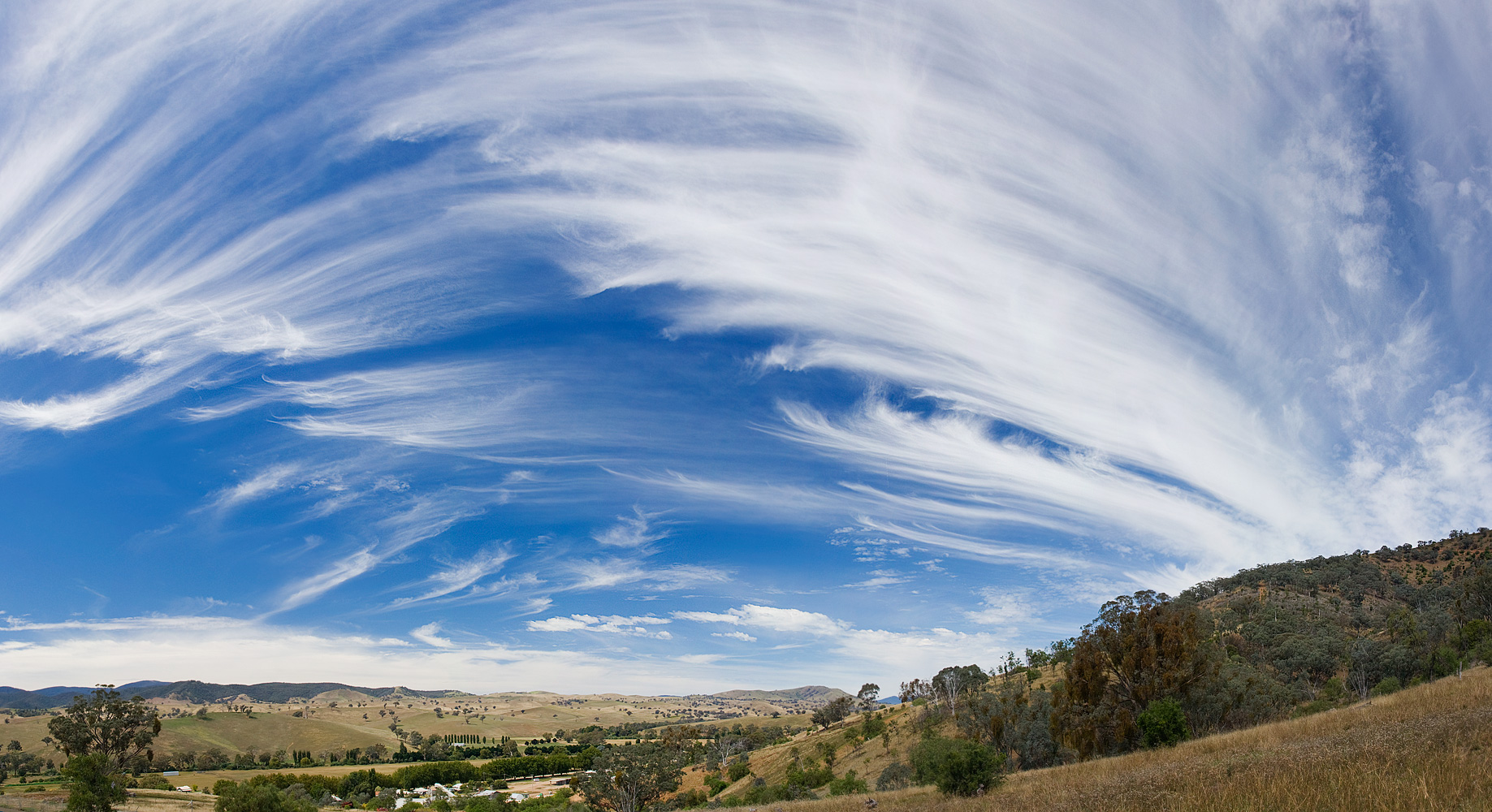
High cirrus upper-left merging into cirrostratus right and some cirrocumulus far right

High clouds form at altitudes of 3,000 to 7,600 m (10,000 to 25,000 ft) in the polar regions, 5,000 to 12,200 m (16,500 to 40,000 ft) in the temperate regions, and 6,100 to 18,300 m (20,000 to 60,000 ft) in the tropics. All cirriform clouds are classified as high, thus constitute a single genus cirrus (Ci). Stratocumuliform and stratiform clouds in the high altitude range carry the prefix cirro-, yielding the respective genus names cirrocumulus (Cc) and cirrostratus (Cs). If limited-resolution satellite images of high clouds are analyzed without supporting data from direct human observations, distinguishing between individual forms or genus types becomes impossible, and they are collectively identified as high-type (or informally as cirrus-type, though not all high clouds are of the cirrus form or genus).

- Genus cirrus (Ci) – these are mostly fibrous wisps of delicate, white, cirriform, ice crystal clouds that show up clearly against the blue sky. Cirrus are generally non-convective except castellanus and floccus subtypes which show limited convection. They often form along a high altitude jetstream and at the very leading edge of a frontal or low-pressure disturbance where they may merge into cirrostratus. This high-level cloud genus does not produce precipitation.
- Genus cirrocumulus (Cc) – this is a pure white high stratocumuliform layer of limited convection. It is composed of ice crystals or supercooled water droplets appearing as small unshaded round masses or flakes in groups or lines with ripples like sand on a beach. Cirrocumulus occasionally forms alongside cirrus and may be accompanied or replaced by cirrostratus clouds near the leading edge of an active weather system. This genus-type occasionally produces virga, precipitation that evaporates below the base of the cloud.
- Genus cirrostratus (Cs) – cirrostratus is a thin nonconvective stratiform ice crystal veil that typically gives rise to halos caused by refraction of the Sun's rays. The Sun and Moon are visible in clear outline. Cirrostratus does not produce precipitation, but often thickens into altostratus ahead of a warm front or low-pressure area, which sometimes does.

==== Mid-level ====
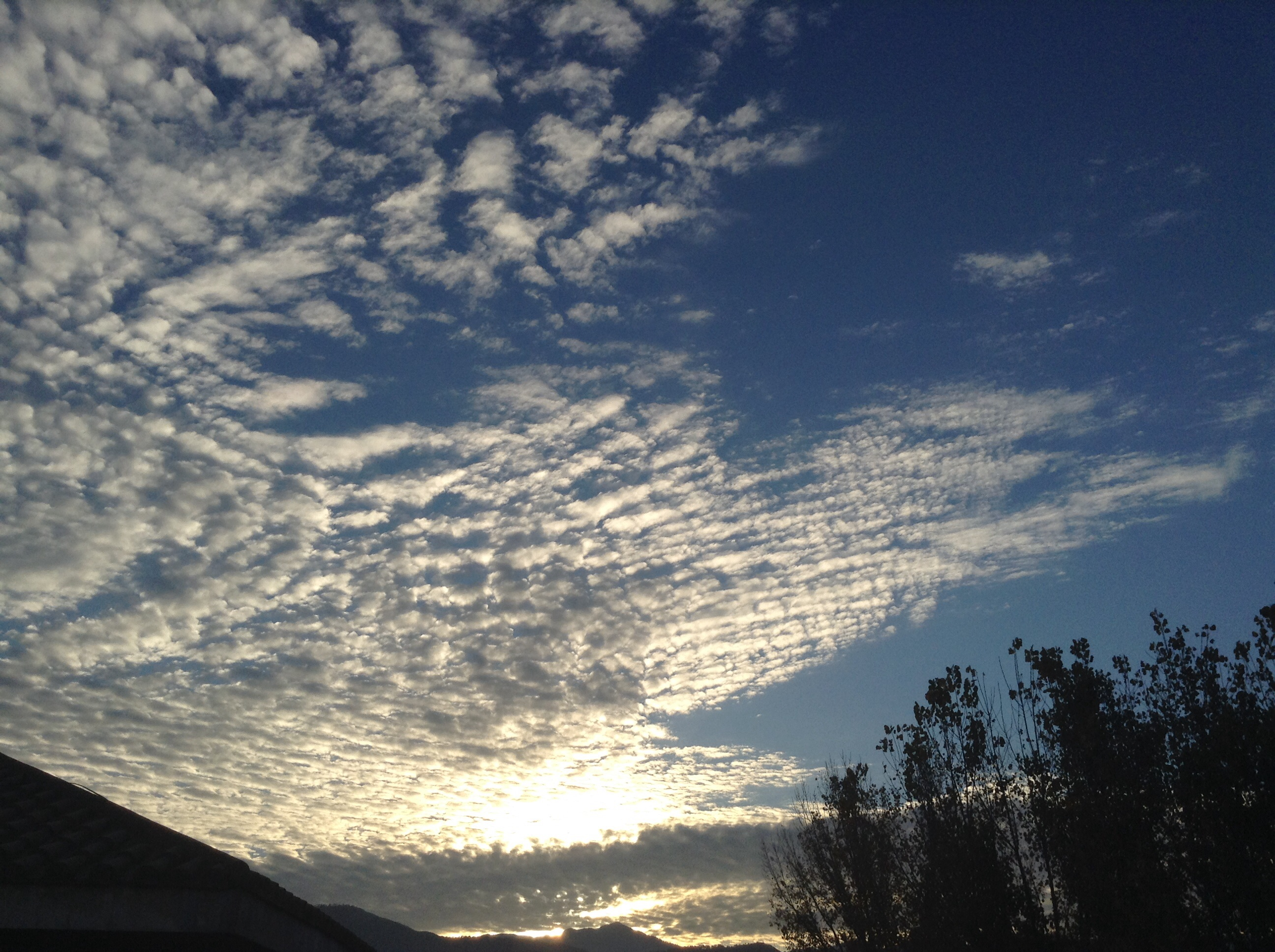
Sunrise scene giving a shine to an altocumulus stratiformis perlucidus cloud

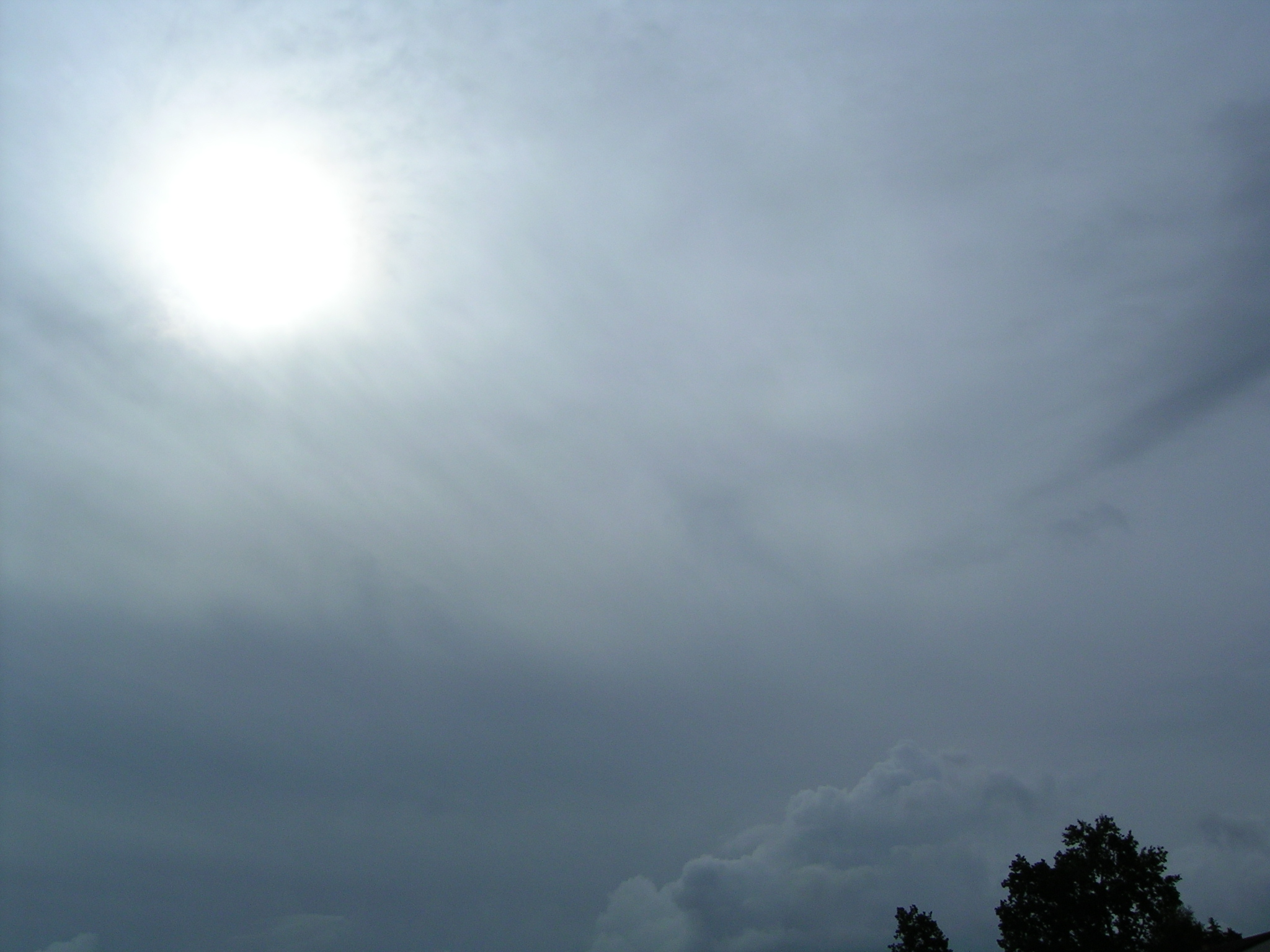
Altostratus translucidus near top of photo thickening into altostratus opacus near bottom (see also 'species and varieties')

Nonvertical clouds in the middle level are prefixed by alto-, yielding the genus names altocumulus (Ac) for stratocumuliform types and altostratus (As) for stratiform types. These clouds can form as low as 2,000 m (6,500 ft) above surface at any latitude, but may be based as high as 4,000 m (13,000 ft) near the poles, 7,000 m (23,000 ft) at midlatitudes, and 7,600 m (25,000 ft) in the tropics. As with high clouds, the main genus types are easily identified by the human eye, but distinguishing between them using satellite photography alone is not possible. When the supporting data of human observations are not available, these clouds are usually collectively identified as middle-type on satellite images.

- Genus altocumulus (Ac) – This is a midlevel stratocumuliform cloud layer of limited convection that is usually appears in the form of irregular patches or more extensive sheets arranged in groups, lines, or waves. Altocumulus may occasionally resemble cirrocumulus, but is usually thicker and composed of a mix of water droplets and ice crystals, so the bases show at least some light-gray shading. Altocumulus can produce virga, very light precipitation that evaporates before reaching the ground.
- Genus altostratus (As) – Altostratus is a midlevel opaque or translucent nonconvective veil of gray/blue-gray cloud that often forms along warm fronts and around low-pressure areas. Altostratus is usually composed of water droplets, but may be mixed with ice crystals at higher altitudes. Widespread opaque altostratus can produce light continuous or intermittent precipitation.

==== Low-level ====
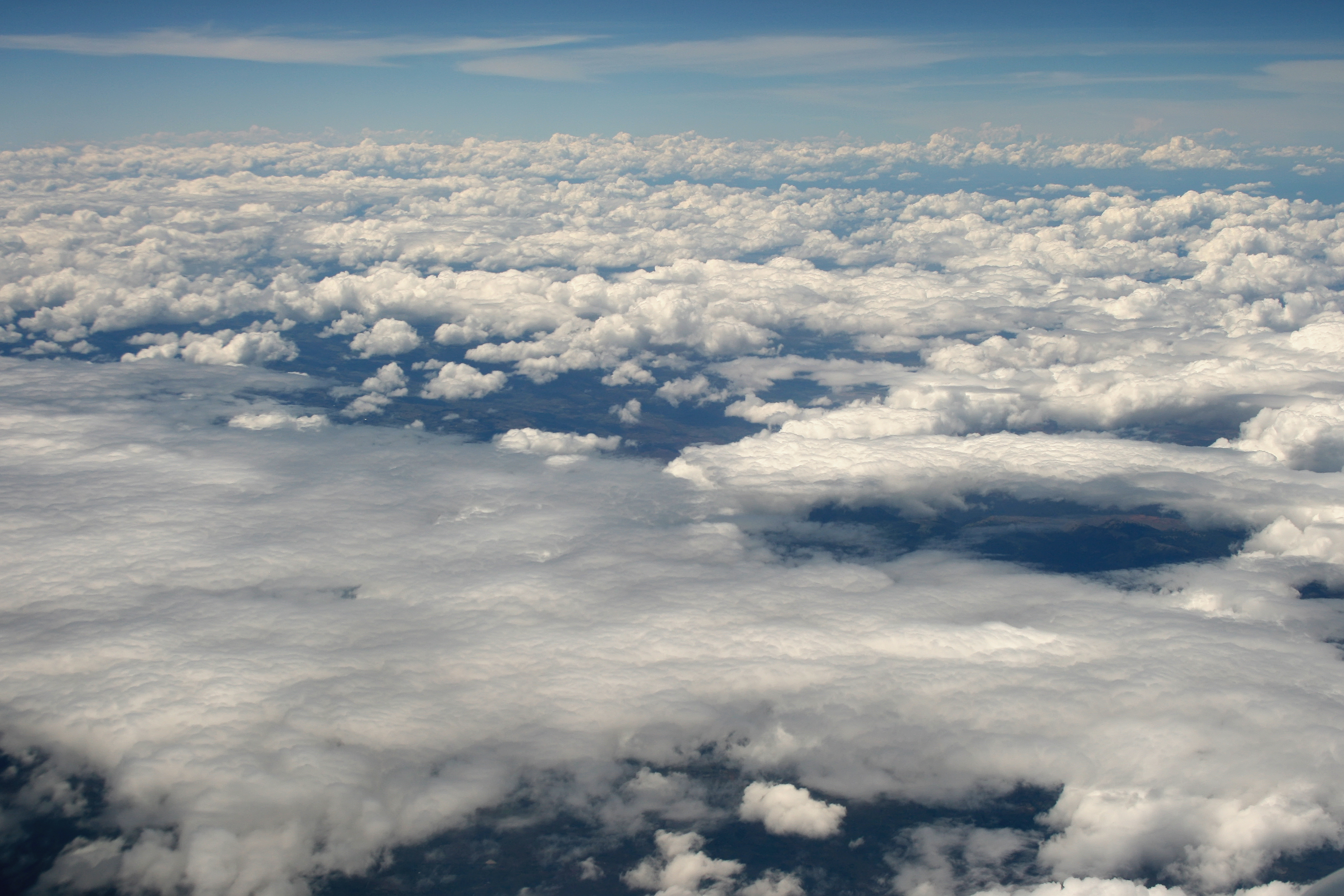
Cumulus humilis with stratocumulus stratiformis in the foreground (see also 'species and varieties')

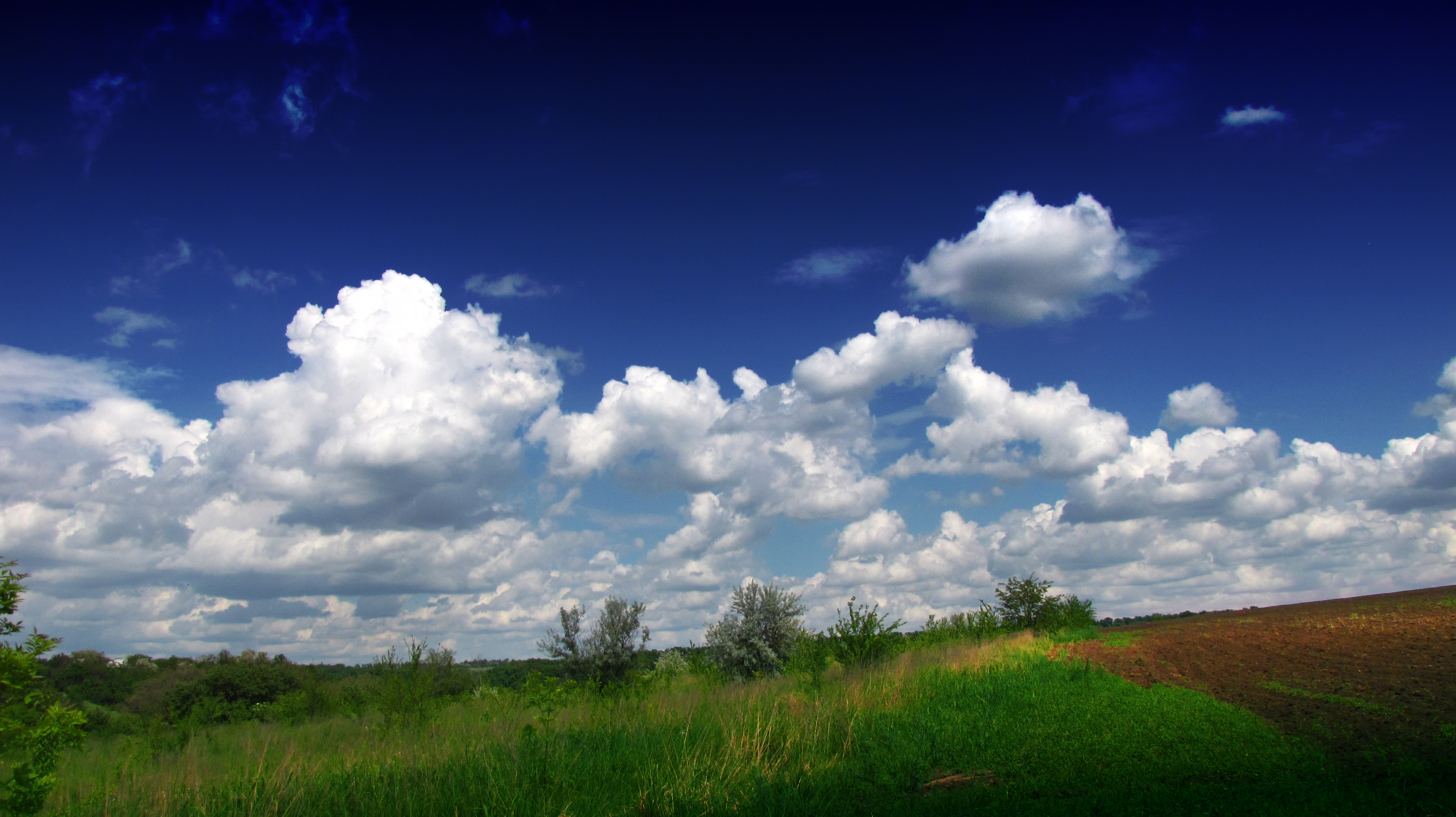
Cumulus humilis clouds in May

Low clouds are found from near the surface up to 2,000 m (6,500 ft). Genus types in this level either have no prefix or carry one that refers to a characteristic other than altitude. Clouds that form in the low level of the troposphere are generally of larger structure than those that form in the middle and high levels, so they can usually be identified by their forms and genus types using satellite photography alone.

- Genus stratocumulus (Sc) – This genus type is a stratocumuliform cloud layer of limited convection, usually in the form of irregular patches or more extensive sheets similar to altocumulus but having larger elements with deeper-gray shading. Stratocumulus is often present during wet weather originating from other rain clouds, but can only produce very light precipitation on its own.
- Species cumulus humilis – These are small detached fair-weather cumuliform clouds that have nearly horizontal bases and flattened tops, and do not produce rain showers.
- Genus stratus (St) – This is a flat or sometimes ragged nonconvective stratiform type that sometimes resembles elevated fog. Only very weak precipitation can fall from this cloud, usually drizzle or snow grains. When a very low stratus cloud subsides to surface level, it loses its Latin terminology and is given the common name fog if the prevailing surface visibility is less than 1 km (0.62 mi). If the visibility is 1 km or higher, the visible condensation is termed mist.

==== Multi-level or moderate vertical ====
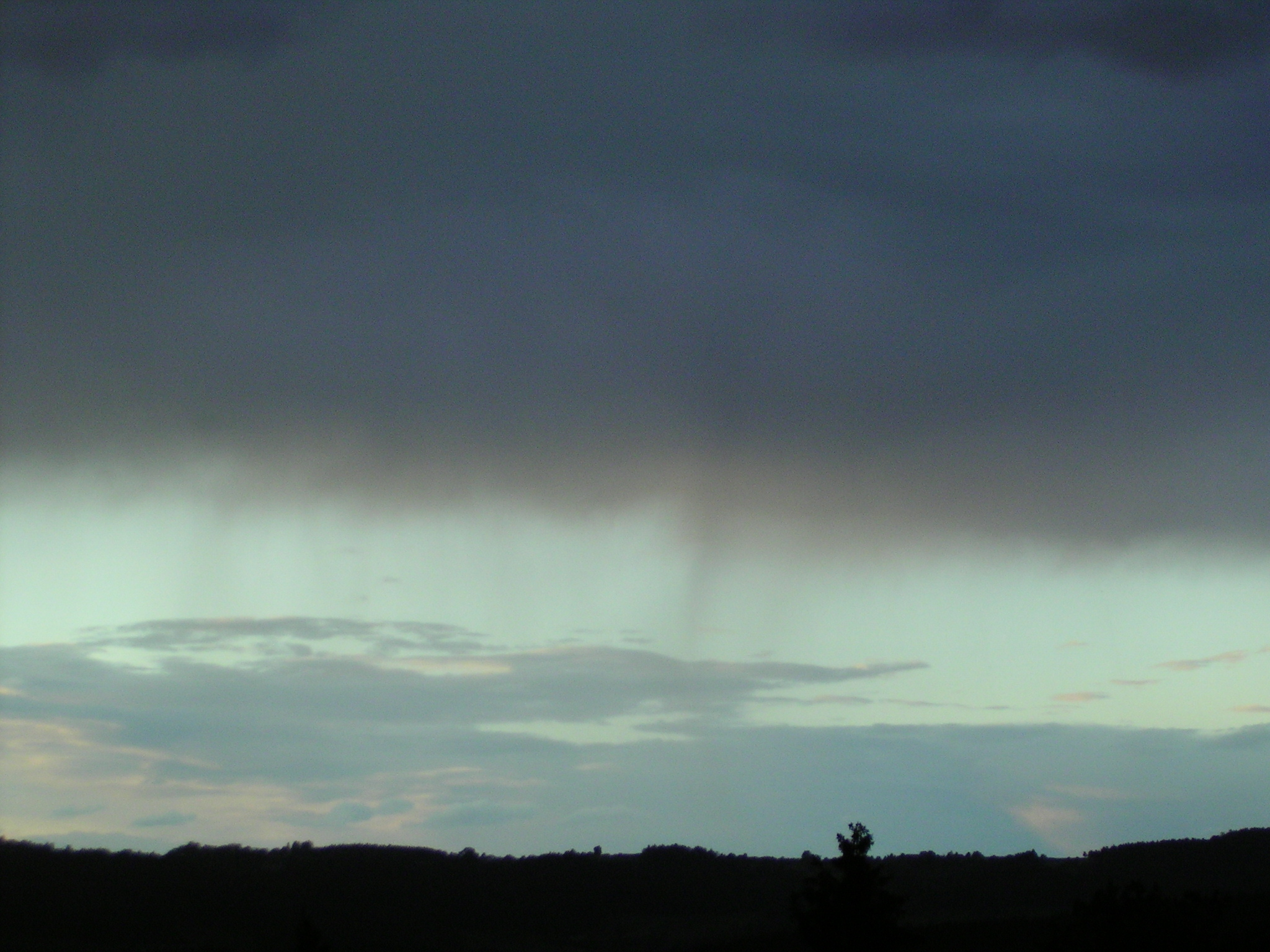
Nimbostratus with virga

These clouds have low- to mid-level bases that form anywhere from near the surface to about 2,400 m (8,000 ft) and tops that can extend into the mid-altitude range and sometimes higher in the case of nimbostratus.

- Genus nimbostratus (Ns) – This is a diffuse, dark gray, multi-level stratiform layer with great horizontal extent and usually moderate to deep vertical development that looks feebly illuminated from the inside. Nimbostratus normally forms from mid-level altostratus, and develops at least moderate vertical extent when the base subsides into the low level during precipitation that can reach moderate to heavy intensity. It achieves even greater vertical development when it simultaneously grows upward into the high level due to large-scale frontal or cyclonic lift. The nimbo- prefix refers to its ability to produce continuous rain or snow over a wide area, especially ahead of a warm front. This thick cloud layer lacks any towering structure of its own, but may be accompanied by embedded towering cumuliform or cumulonimbiform types. Meteorologists affiliated with the World Meteorological Organization (WMO) officially classify nimbostratus as mid-level for synoptic purposes while informally characterizing it as multi-level. Independent meteorologists and educators appear split between those who largely follow the WMO model and those who classify nimbostratus as low-level, despite its considerable vertical extent and its usual initial formation in the middle altitude range.
- Species cumulus mediocris – These cumuliform clouds of free convection have clear-cut, medium-gray, flat bases and white, domed tops in the form of small sproutings and generally do not produce precipitation. They usually form in the low level of the troposphere except during conditions of very low relative humidity, when the cloud bases can rise into the middle-altitude range. Cumulus mediocris is officially classified as low-level and more informally characterized as having moderate vertical extent that can involve more than one altitude level.

==== Towering vertical ====
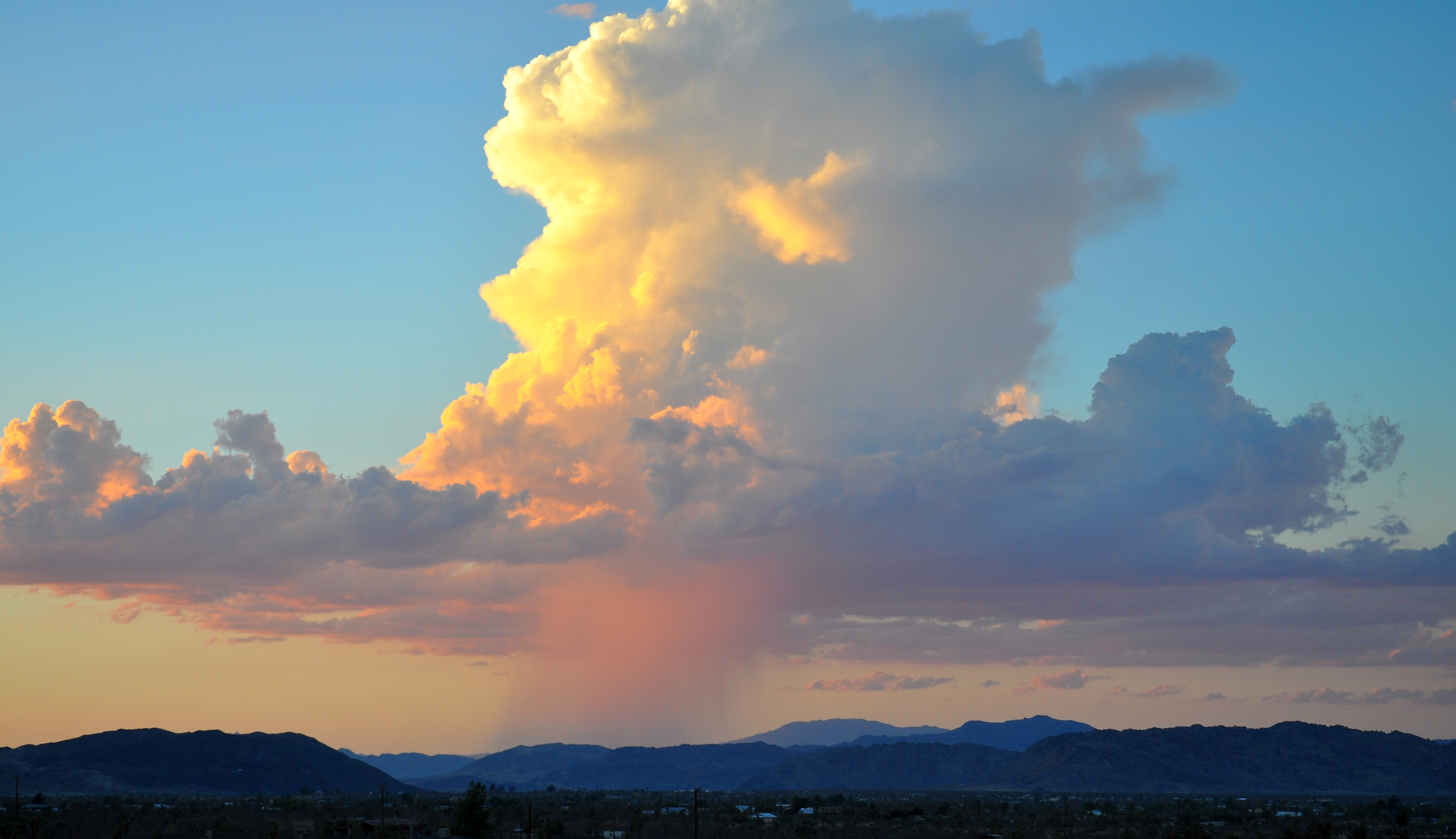
Isolated cumulonimbus calvus cloud over the Mojave Desert, releasing a heavy shower

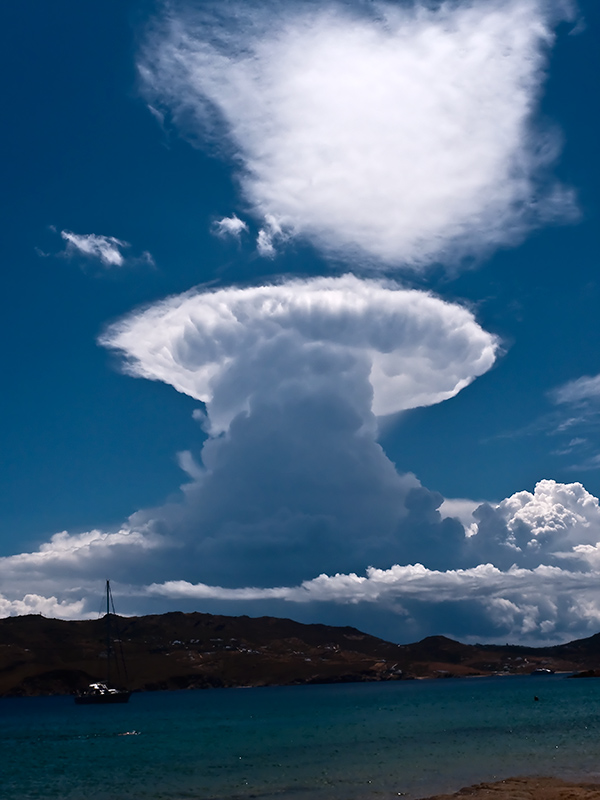
Single-cell Cumulonimbus capillatus incus

These very large cumuliform and cumulonimbiform types have cloud bases in the same low- to mid-level range as the multi-level and moderate vertical types, but the tops nearly always extend into the high levels. Unlike less vertically developed clouds, they are required to be identified by their standard names or abbreviations in all aviation observations (METARS) and forecasts (TAFS) to warn pilots of possible severe weather and turbulence.

- Species cumulus congestus – Increasing airmass instability can cause free-convective cumulus to grow very tall to the extent that the vertical height from base to top is greater than the base-width of the cloud. The cloud base takes on a darker gray coloration and the top commonly resembles a cauliflower. This cloud type can produce moderate to heavy showers and is designated Towering cumulus (Tcu) by the International Civil Aviation Organization (ICAO).
- Genus cumulonimbus (Cb) – This genus type is a heavy, towering, cumulonimbiform mass of free-convective cloud with a dark-gray to nearly black base and a very high top in the form of a mountain or huge tower. Cumulonimbus can produce thunderstorms, local very heavy downpours of rain that may cause flash floods, and a variety of types of lightning including cloud-to-ground that can cause wildfires. Other convective severe weather may or may not be associated with thunderstorms and include heavy snow showers, hail, strong wind shear, downbursts, and tornadoes. Of all these possible cumulonimbus-related events, lightning is the only one of these that requires a thunderstorm to be taking place since it is the lightning that creates the thunder. Cumulonimbus clouds can form in unstable airmass conditions, but tend to be more concentrated and intense when they are associated with unstable cold fronts.

=== Species ===
Genus types are commonly divided into subtypes called species that indicate specific structural details which can vary according to the stability and windshear characteristics of the atmosphere at any given time and location. Despite this hierarchy, a particular species may be a subtype of more than one genus, especially if the genera are of the same physical form and are differentiated from each other mainly by altitude or level. There are a few species, each of which can be associated with genera of more than one physical form. The species types are grouped below according to the physical forms and genera with which each is normally associated. The forms, genera, and species are listed from left to right in approximate ascending order of instability or convective activity.

Forms and levels	Stratiform non-convective	Cirriform mostly nonconvective	Stratocumuliform limited-convective	Cumuliform free-convective	Cumulonimbiform strong convective
High-level	Cirrostratus: nebulosus; fibratus	Cirrus non-convective: uncinus; fibratus; spissatus; limited convective: castellanus; floccus	Cirrocumulus: stratiformis; lenticularis; castellanus; floccus		
Mid-level	Altostratus: no differentiated species (always nebulous)		Altocumulus: stratiformis; lenticularis; castellanus; floccus; volutus		
Low-level	Stratus: nebulosus; fractus		Stratocumulus: stratiformis; lenticularis; castellanus; floccus; volutus	Cumulus: humilis; fractus	
Multi-level or moderate vertical	Nimbostratus: no differentiated species (always nebulous)			Cumulus: mediocris	
Towering vertical				Cumulus: congestus	Cumulonimbus: calvus; capillatus

==== Stable or mostly stable ====
Of the non-convective stratiform group, high-level cirrostratus comprises two species. Cirrostratus nebulosus has a rather diffuse appearance lacking in structural detail. Cirrostratus fibratus is a species made of semi-merged filaments that are transitional to or from cirrus. Mid-level altostratus and multi-level nimbostratus always have a flat or diffuse appearance and are therefore not subdivided into species. Low stratus is of the species nebulosus except when broken up into ragged sheets of stratus fractus (see below).

Cirriform clouds have three non-convective species that can form in stable airmass conditions. Cirrus fibratus comprise filaments that may be straight, wavy, or occasionally twisted by wind shear. The species uncinus is similar but has upturned hooks at the ends. Cirrus spissatus appear as opaque patches that can show light gray shading.

Altocumulus lenticularis forming over mountains in Wyoming with lower layer of cumulus mediocris and higher layer of cirrus spissatus

Stratocumuliform genus-types (cirrocumulus, altocumulus, and stratocumulus) that appear in mostly stable air with limited convection have two species each. The stratiformis species normally occur in extensive sheets or in smaller patches where there is only minimal convective activity. Clouds of the lenticularis species tend to have lens-like shapes tapered at the ends. They are most commonly seen as orographic mountain-wave clouds, but can occur anywhere in the troposphere where there is strong wind shear combined with sufficient airmass stability to maintain a generally flat cloud structure. These two species can be found in the high, middle, or low levels of the troposphere depending on the stratocumuliform genus or genera present at any given time.

==== Ragged ====
The species fractus shows variable instability because it can be a subdivision of genus-types of different physical forms that have different stability characteristics. This subtype can be in the form of ragged but mostly stable stratiform sheets (stratus fractus) or small ragged cumuliform heaps with somewhat greater instability (cumulus fractus). When clouds of this species are associated with precipitating cloud systems of considerable vertical and sometimes horizontal extent, they are also classified as accessory clouds under the name pannus (see section on supplementary features).

==== Partly unstable ====
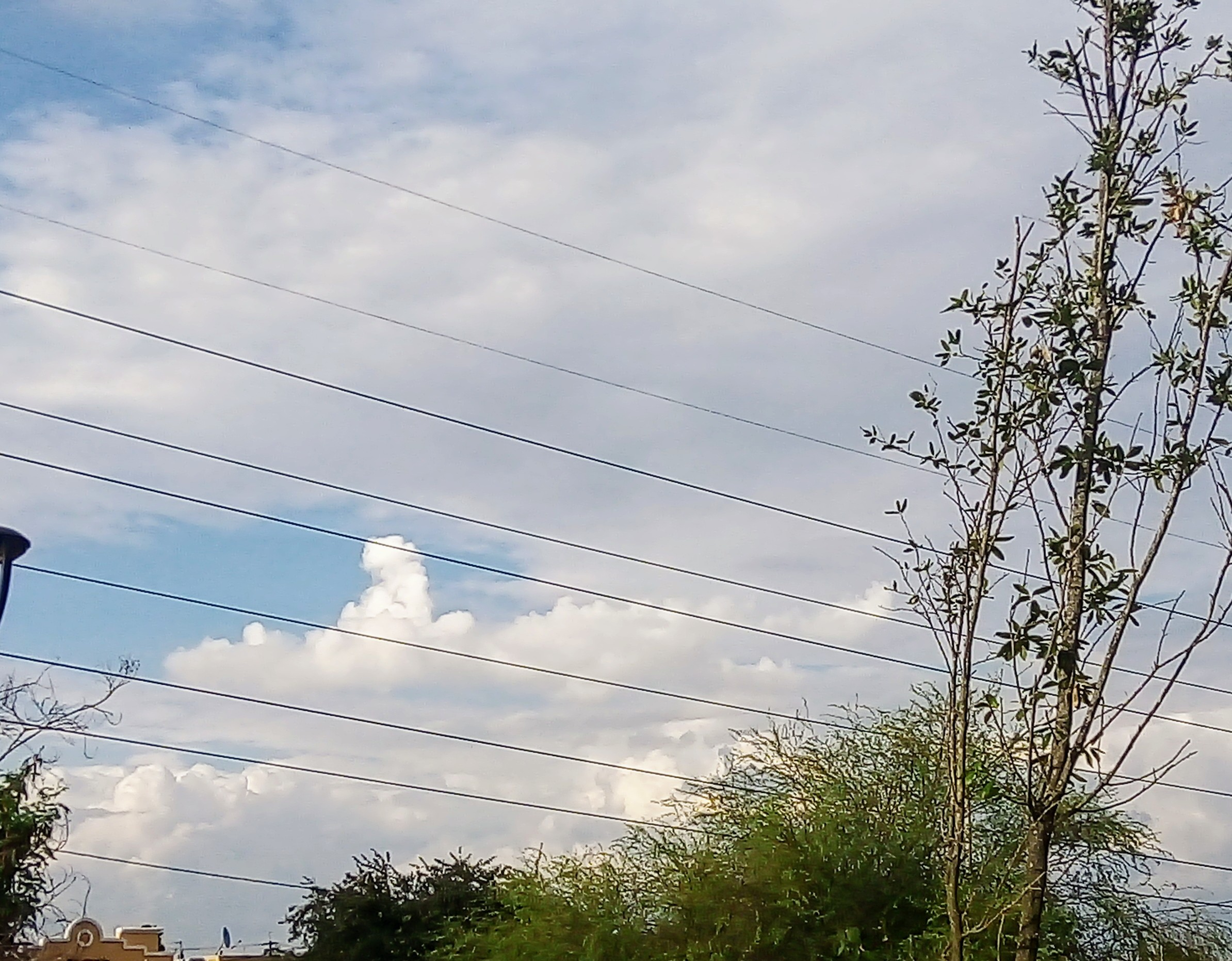
Example of a castellanus cloud formation

These species are subdivisions of genus types that can occur in partly unstable air with limited convection. The species castellanus appears when a mostly stable stratocumuliform or cirriform layer becomes disturbed by localized areas of airmass instability, usually in the morning or afternoon. This results in the formation of embedded cumuliform buildups arising from a common stratiform base. Castellanus resembles the turrets of a castle when viewed from the side, and can be found with stratocumuliform genera at any tropospheric altitude level and with limited-convective patches of high-level cirrus. Tufted clouds of the more detached floccus species are subdivisions of genus-types which may be cirriform or stratocumuliform in overall structure. They are sometimes seen with cirrus, cirrocumulus, altocumulus, and stratocumulus.

A newly recognized species of stratocumulus or altocumulus has been given the name volutus, a roll cloud that can occur ahead of a cumulonimbus formation. There are some volutus clouds that form as a consequence of interactions with specific geographical features rather than with a parent cloud. Perhaps the strangest geographically specific cloud of this type is the Morning Glory, a rolling cylindrical cloud that appears unpredictably over the Gulf of Carpentaria in Northern Australia. Associated with a powerful "ripple" in the atmosphere, the cloud may be "surfed" in glider aircraft.

==== Unstable or mostly unstable ====
More general airmass instability in the troposphere tends to produce clouds of the more freely convective cumulus genus type, whose species are mainly indicators of degrees of atmospheric instability and resultant vertical development of the clouds. A cumulus cloud initially forms in the low level of the troposphere as a cloudlet of the species humilis that shows only slight vertical development. If the air becomes more unstable, the cloud tends to grow vertically into the species mediocris, then strongly convective congestus, the tallest cumulus species which is the same type that the International Civil Aviation Organization refers to as 'towering cumulus'.

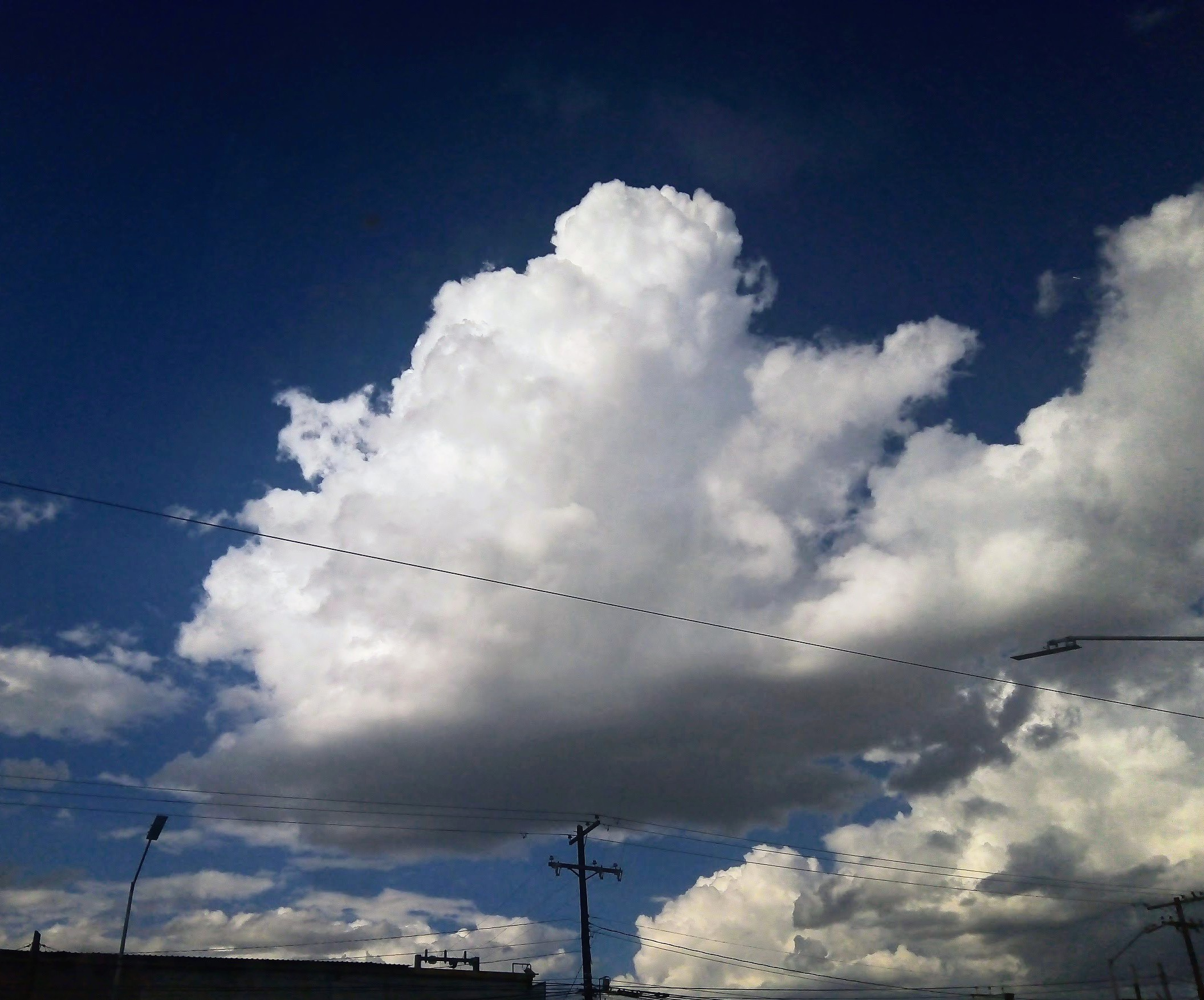
Cumulus mediocris cloud, about to turn into a cumulus congestus

With highly unstable atmospheric conditions, large cumulus may continue to grow into even more strongly convective cumulonimbus calvus (essentially a very tall congestus cloud that produces thunder), then ultimately into the species capillatus when supercooled water droplets at the top of the cloud turn into ice crystals giving it a cirriform appearance.

=== Varieties ===
Genus and species types are further subdivided into varieties whose names can appear after the species name to provide a fuller description of a cloud. Some cloud varieties are not restricted to a specific altitude level or form, and can therefore be common to more than one genus or species.

==== Opacity-based ====
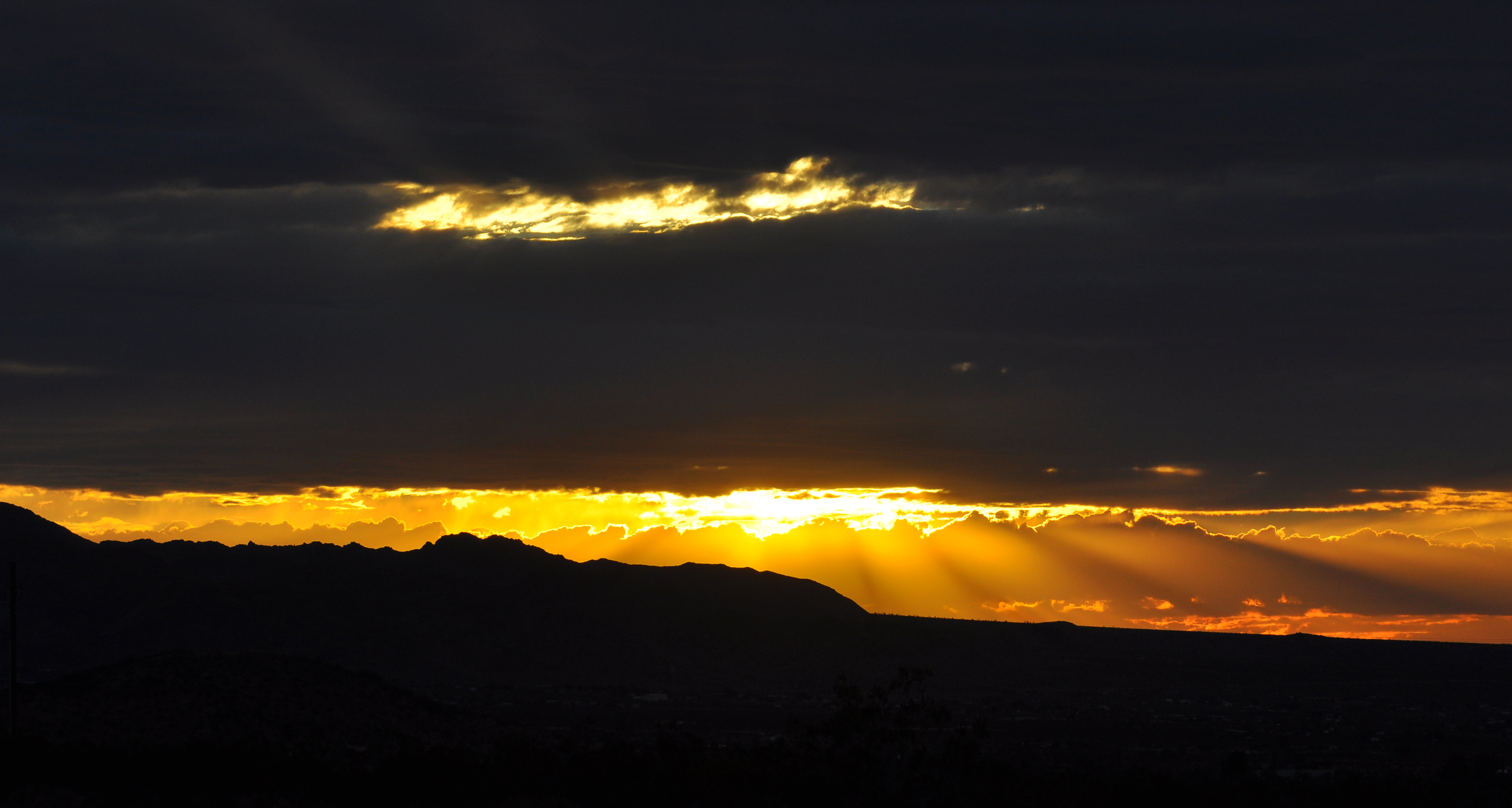
A layer of stratocumulus stratiformis perlucidus hiding the setting sun with a background layer of stratocumulus cumulogenitus resembling distant mountains

All cloud varieties fall into one of two main groups. One group identifies the opacities of particular low and mid-level cloud structures and comprises the varieties translucidus (thin translucent), perlucidus (thick opaque with translucent or very small clear breaks), and opacus (thick opaque). These varieties are always identifiable for cloud genera and species with variable opacity. All three are associated with the stratiformis species of altocumulus and stratocumulus. However, only two varieties are seen with altostratus and stratus nebulosus whose uniform structures prevent the formation of a perlucidus variety. Opacity-based varieties are not applied to high clouds because they are always translucent, or in the case of cirrus spissatus, always opaque.

==== Pattern-based ====
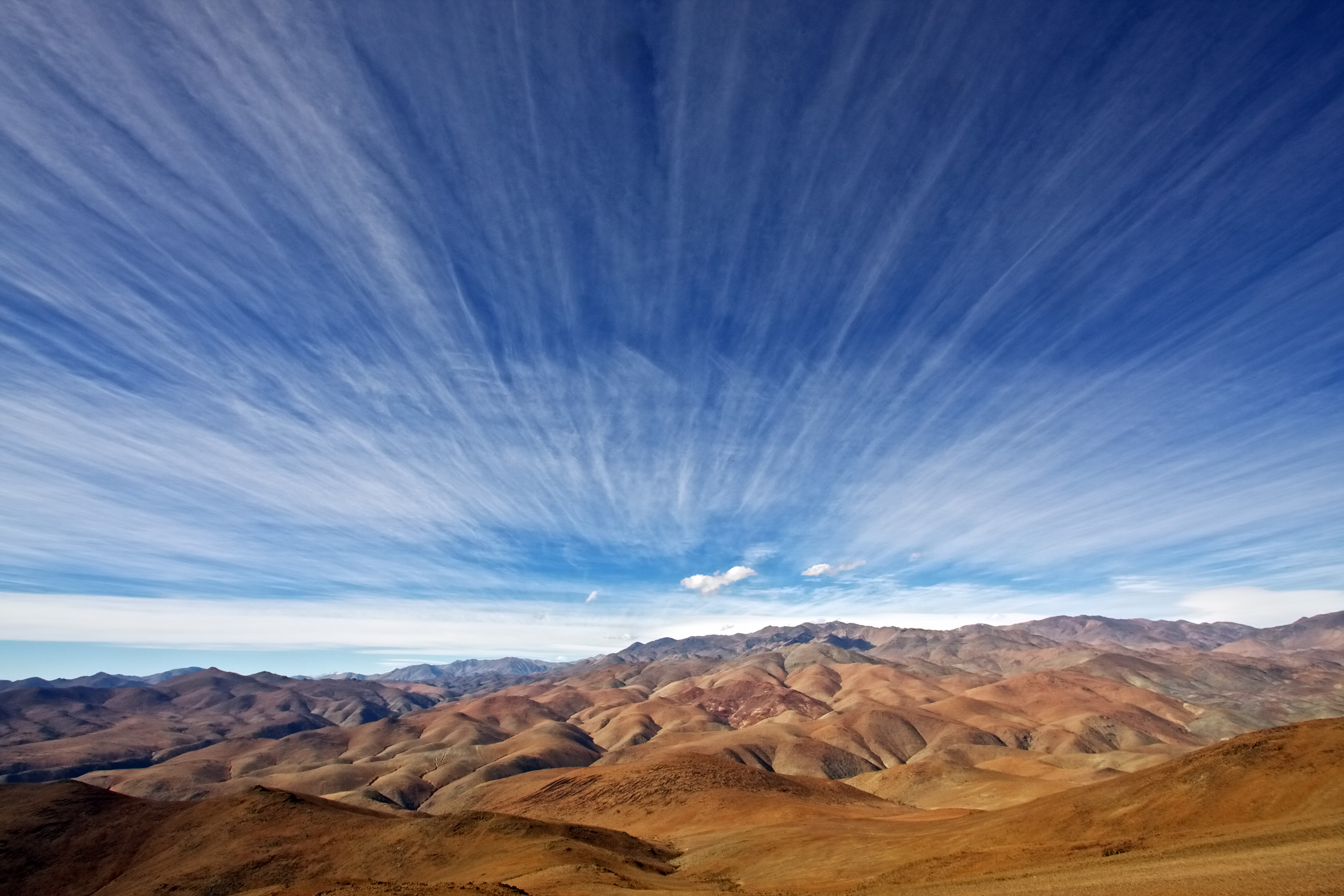
Cirrus fibratus radiatus over ESO's La Silla Observatory

A second group describes the occasional arrangements of cloud structures into particular patterns that are discernible by a surface-based observer (cloud fields usually being visible only from a significant altitude above the formations). These varieties are not always present with the genera and species with which they are otherwise associated, but only appear when atmospheric conditions favor their formation. Intortus and vertebratus varieties occur on occasion with cirrus fibratus. They are respectively filaments twisted into irregular shapes, and those that are arranged in fishbone patterns, usually by uneven wind currents that favor the formation of these varieties. The variety radiatus is associated with cloud rows of a particular type that appear to converge at the horizon. It is sometimes seen with the fibratus and uncinus species of cirrus, the stratiformis species of altocumulus and stratocumulus, the mediocris and sometimes humilis species of cumulus, and with the genus altostratus.

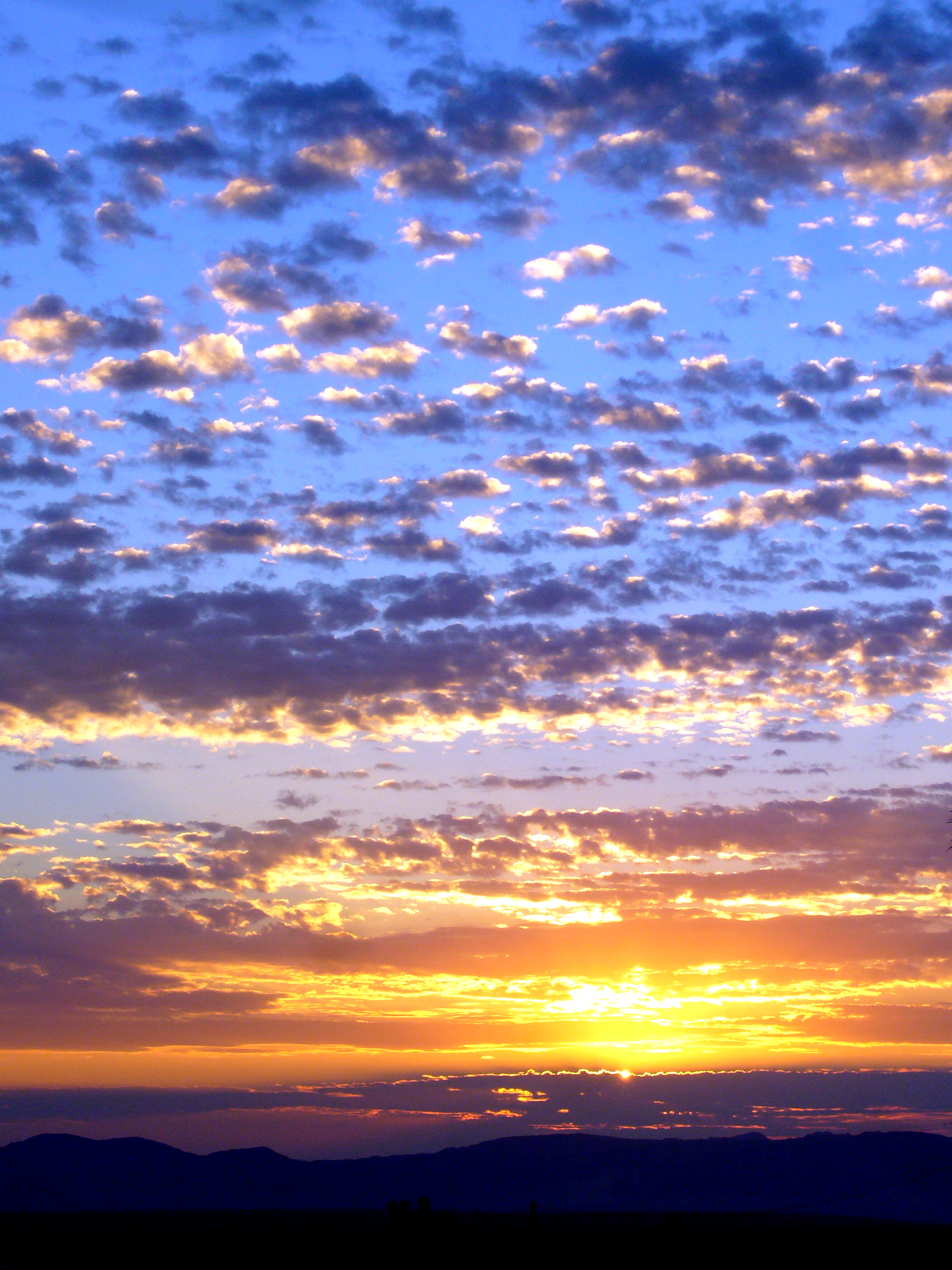
Altocumulus stratiformis duplicatus at sunrise in the California Mojave Desert, US (higher layer orange to white; lower layer gray)

Another variety, duplicatus (closely spaced layers of the same type, one above the other), is sometimes found with cirrus of both the fibratus and uncinus species, and with altocumulus and stratocumulus of the species stratiformis and lenticularis. The variety undulatus (having a wavy undulating base) can occur with any clouds of the species stratiformis or lenticularis, and with altostratus. It is only rarely observed with stratus nebulosus. The variety lacunosus is caused by localized downdrafts that create circular holes in the form of a honeycomb or net. It is occasionally seen with cirrocumulus and altocumulus of the species stratiformis, castellanus, and floccus, and with stratocumulus of the species stratiformis and castellanus.

==== Combinations ====
It is possible for some species to show combined varieties at one time, especially if one variety is opacity-based and the other is pattern-based. An example of this would be a layer of altocumulus stratiformis arranged in seemingly converging rows separated by small breaks. The full technical name of a cloud in this configuration would be altocumulus stratiformis radiatus perlucidus, which would identify respectively its genus, species, and two combined varieties.

=== Other types ===
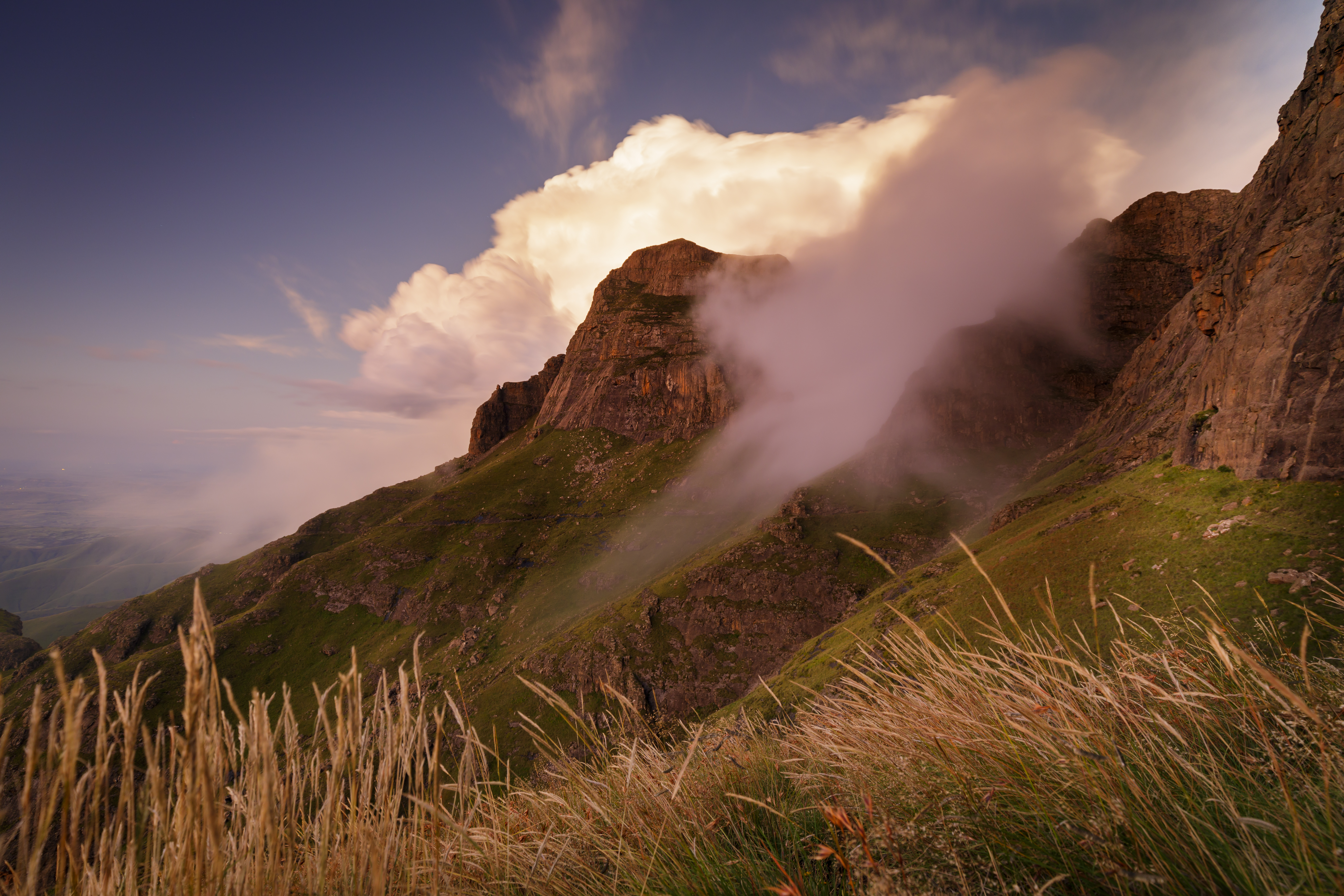
Clouds on mountains

Supplementary features and accessory clouds are not further subdivisions of cloud types below the species and variety level. Rather, they are either hydrometeors or special cloud types with their own Latin names that form in association with certain cloud genera, species, and varieties. Supplementary features, whether in the form of clouds or precipitation, are directly attached to the main genus-cloud. Accessory clouds, by contrast, are generally detached from the main cloud.

==== Precipitation-based supplementary features ====
One group of supplementary features are not actual cloud formations, but precipitation that falls when water droplets or ice crystals that make up visible clouds have grown too heavy to remain aloft. Virga is a feature seen with clouds producing precipitation that evaporates before reaching the ground, these being of the genera cirrocumulus, altocumulus, altostratus, nimbostratus, stratocumulus, cumulus, and cumulonimbus.

When the precipitation reaches the ground without completely evaporating, it is designated as the feature praecipitatio. This normally occurs with altostratus opacus, which can produce widespread but usually light precipitation, and with thicker clouds that show significant vertical development. Of the latter, upward-growing cumulus mediocris produces only isolated light showers, while downward growing nimbostratus is capable of heavier, more extensive precipitation. Towering vertical clouds have the greatest ability to produce intense precipitation events, but these tend to be localized unless organized along fast-moving cold fronts. Showers of moderate to heavy intensity can fall from cumulus congestus clouds. Cumulonimbus, the largest of all cloud genera, has the capacity to produce very heavy showers. Low stratus clouds usually produce only light precipitation, but this always occurs as the feature praecipitatio because this cloud genus lies too close to the ground to allow the formation of virga.

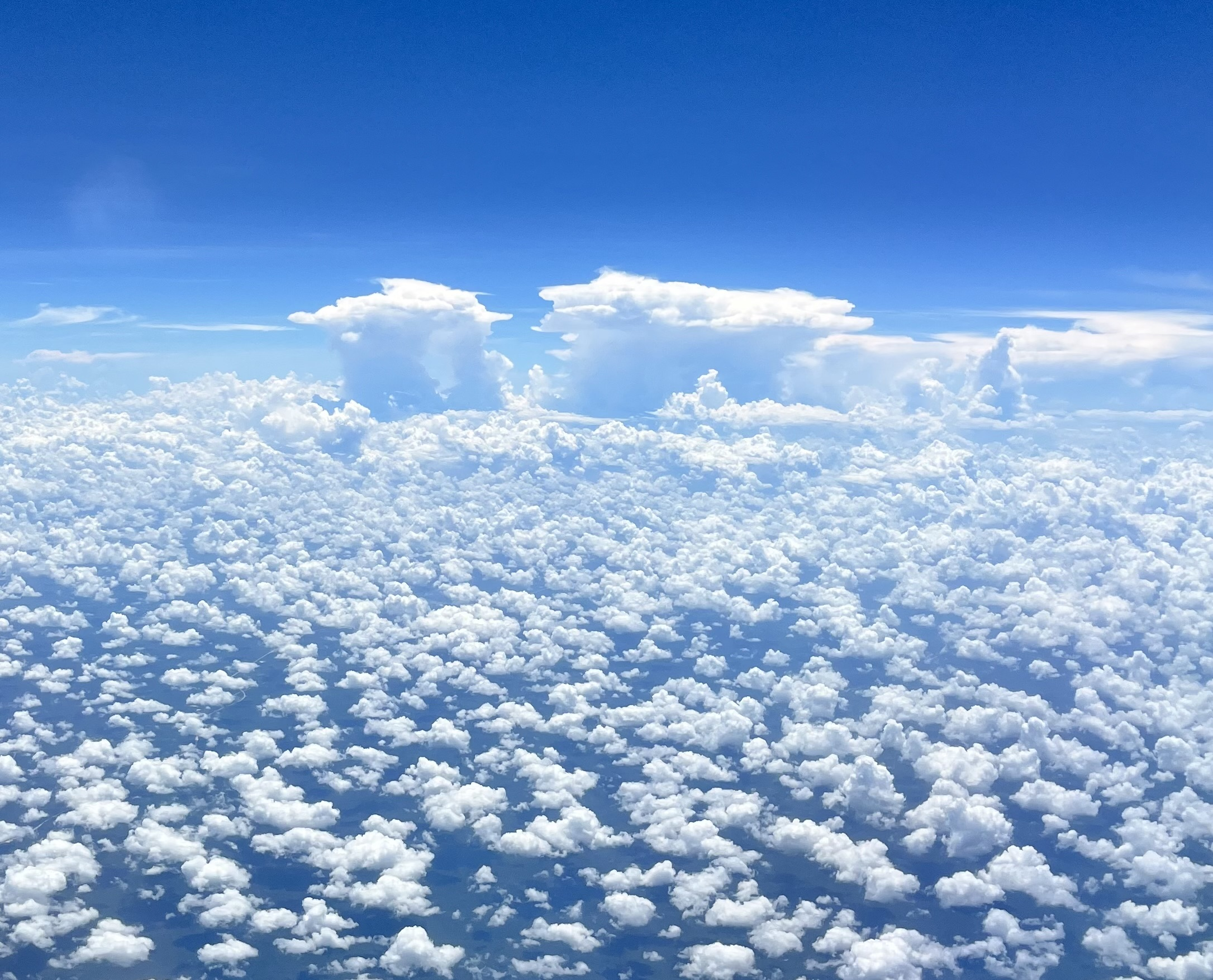
Cumulus humilis clouds covering the sky, Cumulonimbus incus in the background. Over Central America

==== Cloud-based supplementary features ====
Incus is the most type-specific supplementary feature, seen only with cumulonimbus of the species capillatus. A cumulonimbus incus cloud top is one that has spread out into a clear anvil shape as a result of rising air currents hitting the stability layer at the tropopause where the air no longer continues to get colder with increasing altitude.

The mamma feature forms on the bases of clouds as downward-facing bubble-like protuberances caused by localized downdrafts within the cloud. It is also sometimes called mammatus, an earlier version of the term used before a standardization of Latin nomenclature brought about by the World Meteorological Organization during the 20th century. The best-known is cumulonimbus with mammatus, but the mamma feature is also seen occasionally with cirrus, cirrocumulus, altocumulus, altostratus, and stratocumulus.

A tuba feature is a cloud column that may hang from the bottom of a cumulus or cumulonimbus. A newly formed or poorly organized column might be comparatively benign, but can quickly intensify into a funnel cloud or tornado.

An arcus feature is a roll cloud with ragged edges attached to the lower front part of cumulus congestus or cumulonimbus that forms along the leading edge of a squall line or thunderstorm outflow. A large arcus formation can have the appearance of a dark menacing arch.

Several new supplementary features have been formally recognized by the World Meteorological Organization (WMO). The feature fluctus can form under conditions of strong atmospheric wind shear when a stratocumulus, altocumulus, or cirrus cloud breaks into regularly spaced crests. This variant is sometimes known informally as a Kelvin–Helmholtz (wave) cloud. This phenomenon has also been observed in cloud formations over other planets and even in the Sun's atmosphere. Another highly disturbed but more chaotic wave-like cloud feature associated with stratocumulus or altocumulus cloud has been given the Latin name asperitas. The supplementary feature cavum is a circular fall-streak hole that occasionally forms in a thin layer of supercooled altocumulus or cirrocumulus. Fall streaks consisting of virga or wisps of cirrus are usually seen beneath the hole as ice crystals fall out to a lower altitude. This type of hole is usually larger than typical lacunosus holes. A murus feature is a cumulonimbus wall cloud with a lowering, rotating cloud base that can lead to the development of tornadoes. A cauda feature is a tail cloud that extends horizontally away from the murus cloud and is the result of air feeding into the storm.

==== Accessory clouds ====
Supplementary cloud formations detached from the main cloud are known as accessory clouds. The heavier precipitating clouds, nimbostratus, towering cumulus (cumulus congestus), and cumulonimbus typically see the formation in precipitation of the pannus feature, low ragged clouds of the genera and species cumulus fractus or stratus fractus.

A group of accessory clouds comprise formations that are associated mainly with upward-growing cumuliform and cumulonimbiform clouds of free convection. Pileus is a cap cloud that can form over a cumulonimbus or large cumulus cloud, whereas a velum feature is a thin horizontal sheet that sometimes forms like an apron around the middle or in front of the parent cloud. An accessory cloud recently officially recognized by the World Meteorological Organization is the flumen, also known more informally as the beaver's tail. It is formed by the warm, humid inflow of a super-cell thunderstorm, and can be mistaken for a tornado. Although the flumen can indicate a tornado risk, it is similar in appearance to pannus or scud clouds and does not rotate.

==== Mother clouds ====
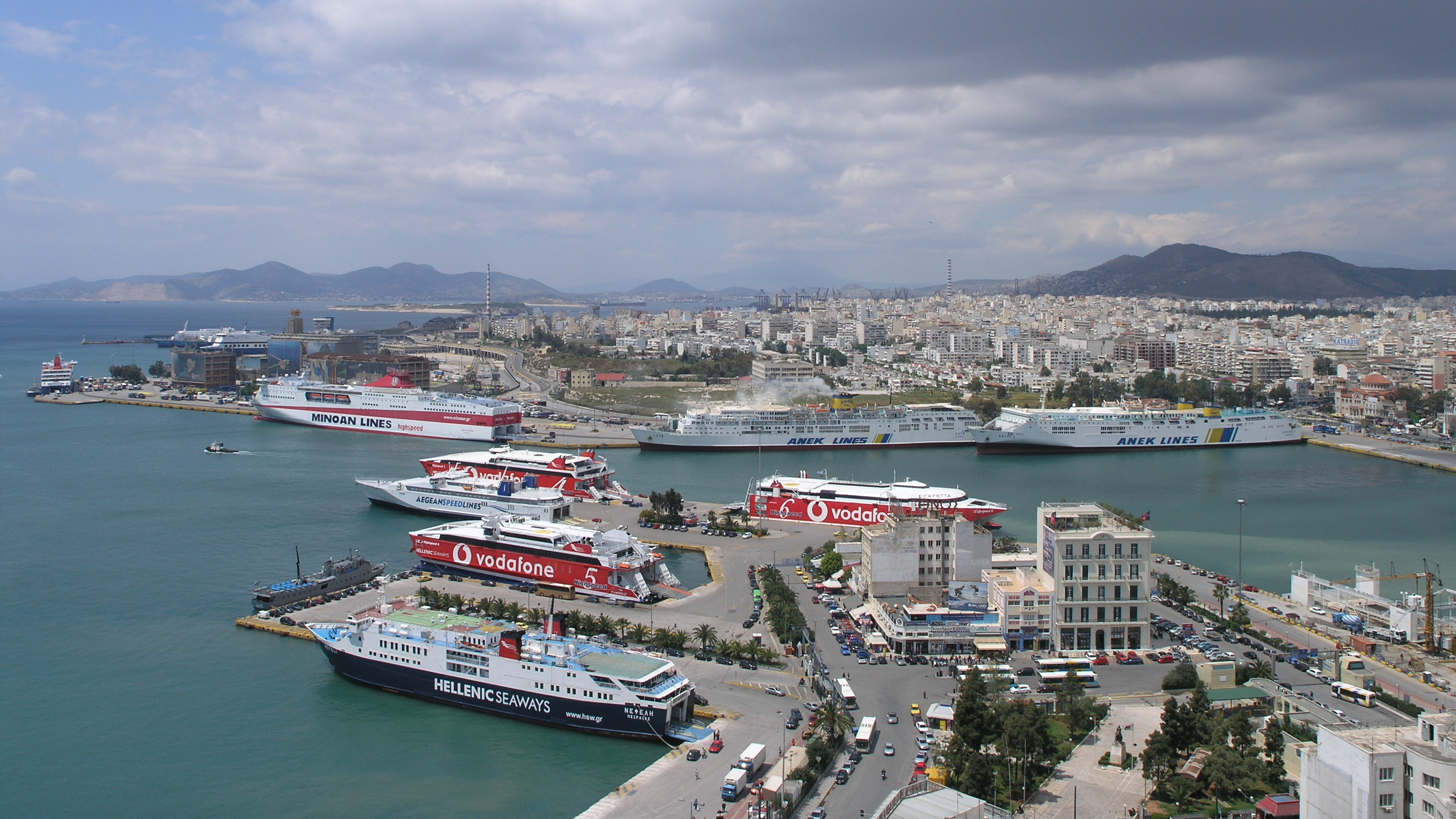
Cumulus partly spreading into stratocumulus cumulogenitus over the port of Piraeus in Greece

Clouds initially form in clear air or become clouds when fog rises above surface level. The genus of a newly formed cloud is determined mainly by air mass characteristics such as stability and moisture content. If these characteristics change over time, the genus tends to change accordingly. When this happens, the original genus is called a mother cloud. If the mother cloud retains much of its original form after the appearance of the new genus, it is termed a genitus cloud. One example of this is stratocumulus cumulogenitus, a stratocumulus cloud formed by the partial spreading of a cumulus type when there is a loss of convective lift. If the mother cloud undergoes a complete change in genus, it is considered to be a mutatus cloud.

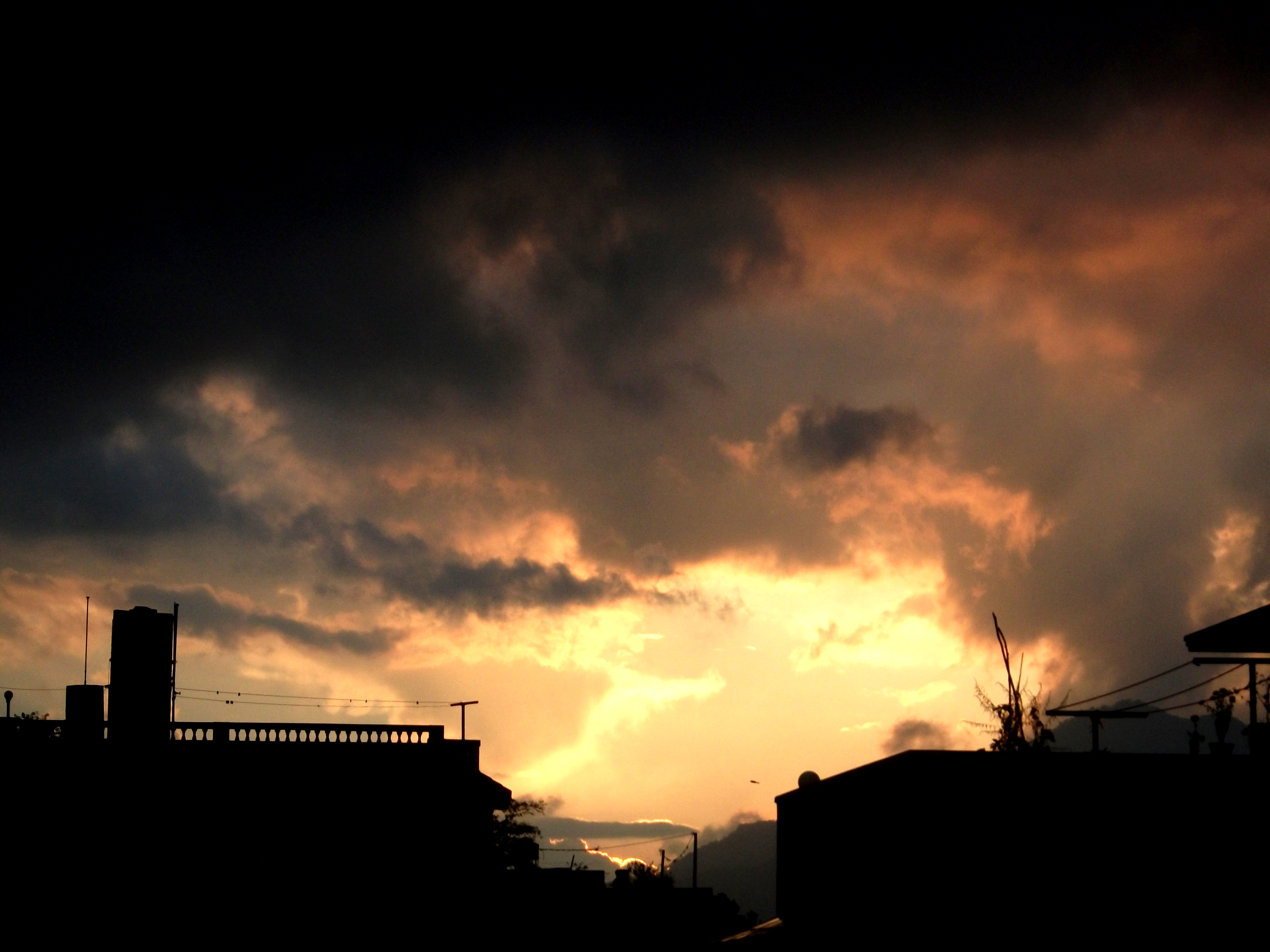
Cumulonimbus mother cloud dissipating into stratocumulus cumulonimbogenitus at dusk

==== Other genitus and mutatus clouds ====
The genitus and mutatus categories have been expanded to include certain types that do not originate from pre-existing clouds. The term flammagenitus (Latin for 'fire-made') applies to cumulus congestus or cumulonimbus that are formed by large scale fires or volcanic eruptions, the latter having reached altitudes of 57 km (35 mi), and nuclear mushroom clouds having an upward extend of up to 67 km (42 mi). Smaller low-level "pyrocumulus" or "fumulus" clouds formed by contained industrial activity are now classified as cumulus homogenitus (Latin for 'man-made'). Contrails formed from the exhaust of aircraft flying in the upper level of the troposphere can persist and spread into formations resembling cirrus which are designated cirrus homogenitus. If a cirrus homogenitus cloud changes fully to any of the high-level genera, they are termed cirrus, cirrostratus, or cirrocumulus homomutatus. Stratus cataractagenitus (Latin for 'cataract-made') are generated by the spray from waterfalls. Silvagenitus (Latin for 'forest-made') is a stratus cloud that forms as water vapor is added to the air above a forest canopy.

=== Large scale patterns ===
Sometimes, certain atmospheric processes cause clouds to become organized into patterns that can cover large areas. These patterns are usually difficult to identify from surface level and are best seen from an aircraft or spacecraft.

==== Stratocumulus fields ====
Stratocumulus clouds can be organized into "fields" that take on certain specially classified shapes and characteristics. In general, these fields are more discernible from high altitudes than from ground level. They can often be found in the following forms:

- Actinoform, which resembles a leaf or a spoked wheel.
- Closed cell, which is cloudy in the center and clear on the edges, similar to a filled honeycomb.
- Open cell, which resembles an empty honeycomb, with clouds around the edges and clear, open space in the middle.

==== Vortex streets ====
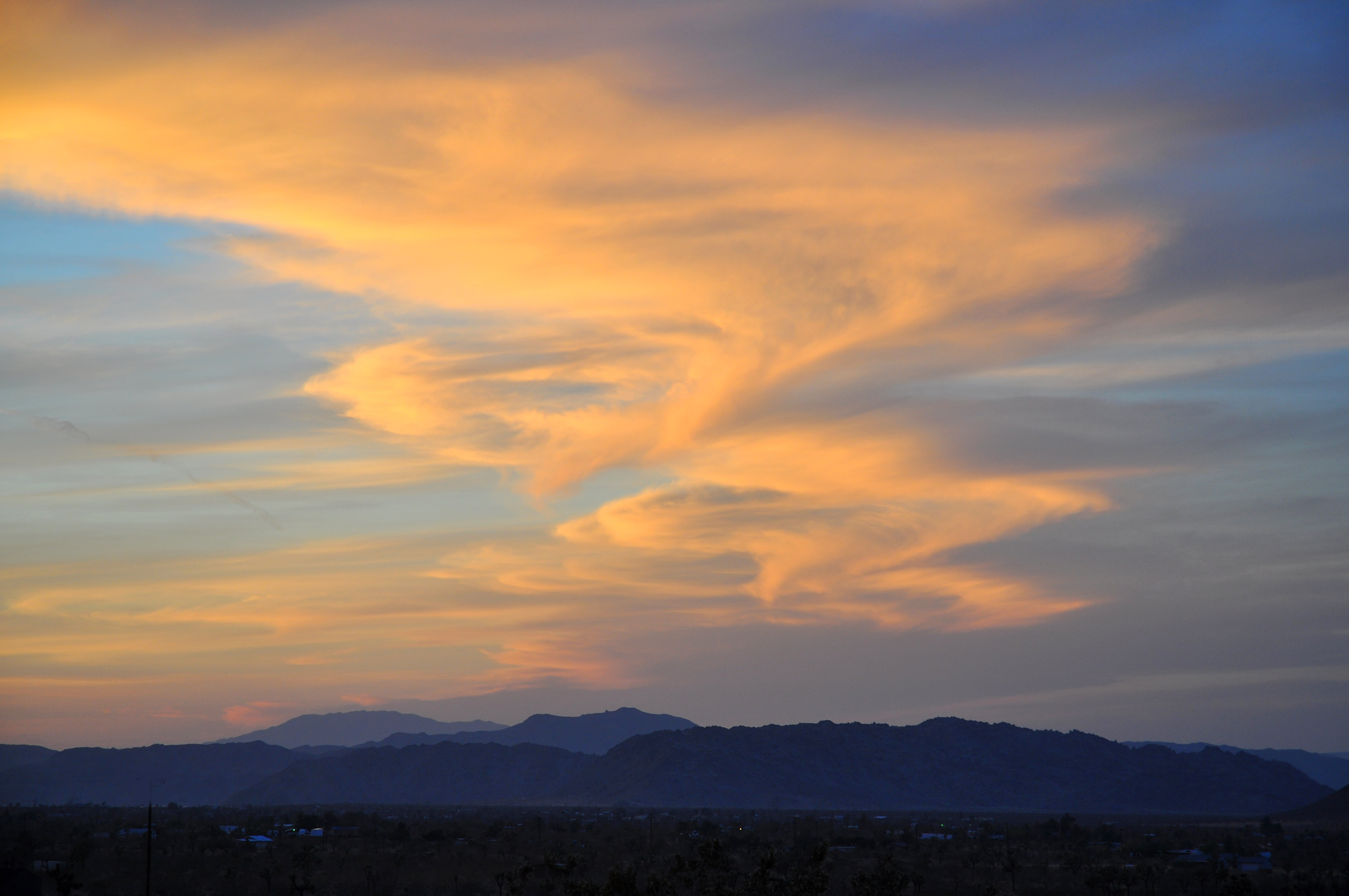
Cirrus fibratus intortus formed into a Kármán vortex street at evening twilight

These patterns are formed from a phenomenon known as a Kármán vortex which is named after the engineer and fluid dynamicist Theodore von Kármán. Wind driven clouds, usually mid level altocumulus or high level cirrus, can form into parallel rows that follow the wind direction. When the wind and clouds encounter high elevation land features such as vertically prominent islands, they can form eddies around the high land masses that give the clouds a twisted appearance.

== Distribution ==
=== Convergence along low-pressure zones ===
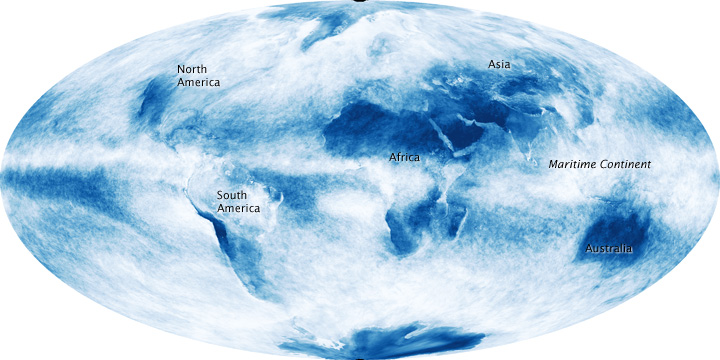
Global cloud cover, averaged over the month of October 2009. NASA composite satellite image.

These maps display the fraction of Earth's area that was cloudy on average during each month from January 2005 to August 2013. The measurements were collected by the Moderate Resolution Imaging Spectroradiometer (MODIS) on NASA's Terra satellite. Colors range from blue (no clouds) to white (totally cloudy). Like a digital camera, MODIS collects information in gridded boxes, or pixels. Cloud fraction is the portion of each pixel that is covered by clouds. Colors range from blue (no clouds) to white (totally cloudy). (click for more detail)

Although the local distribution of clouds can be significantly influenced by topography, the global prevalence of cloud cover in the troposphere tends to vary more by latitude. It is most prevalent in and along low pressure zones of surface tropospheric convergence which encircle the Earth close to the equator and near the 50th parallels of latitude in the northern and southern hemispheres. The adiabatic cooling processes that lead to the creation of clouds by way of lifting agents are all associated with convergence; a process that involves the horizontal inflow and accumulation of air at a given location, as well as the rate at which this happens. Near the equator, increased cloudiness is due to the presence of the low-pressure Intertropical Convergence Zone (ITCZ) where very warm and unstable air promotes mostly cumuliform and cumulonimbiform clouds. Clouds of virtually any type can form along the mid-latitude convergence zones depending on the stability and moisture content of the air. These extratropical convergence zones are occupied by the polar fronts where air masses of polar origin meet and clash with those of tropical or subtropical origin. This leads to the formation of weather-making extratropical cyclones composed of cloud systems that may be stable or unstable to varying degrees according to the stability characteristics of the various airmasses that are in conflict.

=== Divergence along high pressure zones ===
Divergence is the opposite of convergence. In the Earth's troposphere, it involves the horizontal outflow of air from the upper part of a rising column of air, or from the lower part of a subsiding column often associated with an area or ridge of high pressure. Cloudiness tends to be least prevalent near the poles and in the subtropics close to the 30th parallels, north and south. The latter are sometimes referred to as the horse latitudes. The presence of a large-scale high-pressure subtropical ridge on each side of the equator reduces cloudiness at these low latitudes. Similar patterns also occur at higher latitudes in both hemispheres.

== Luminance, reflectivity, and coloration ==
The luminance or brightness of a cloud is determined by how light is reflected, scattered, and transmitted by the cloud's particles. Its brightness may also be affected by the presence of haze or photometeors such as halos and rainbows. In the troposphere, dense, deep clouds exhibit a high reflectance (70–95%) throughout the visible spectrum. Tiny particles of water are densely packed and sunlight cannot penetrate far into the cloud before it is reflected out, giving a cloud its characteristic white color, especially when viewed from the top. Cloud droplets tend to scatter light efficiently, so that the intensity of the solar radiation decreases with depth into the gases. As a result, the cloud base can vary from a very light to very-dark-gray depending on the cloud's thickness and how much light is being reflected or transmitted back to the observer. High thin tropospheric clouds reflect less light because of the comparatively low concentration of constituent ice crystals or supercooled water droplets which results in a slightly off-white appearance. However, a thick dense ice-crystal cloud appears brilliant white with pronounced gray shading because of its greater reflectivity.

As a tropospheric cloud matures, the dense water droplets may combine to produce larger droplets. If the droplets become too large and heavy to be kept aloft by the air circulation, they will fall from the cloud as rain. By this process of accumulation, the space between droplets becomes increasingly larger, permitting light to penetrate farther into the cloud. If the cloud is sufficiently large and the droplets within are spaced far enough apart, a percentage of the light that enters the cloud is not reflected back out but is absorbed, giving the cloud a darker look. A simple example of this is one's being able to see farther in heavy rain than in heavy fog. This process of reflection/absorption is what causes the range of cloud color from white to black.

Striking cloud colorations can be seen at any altitude, with the color of a cloud usually being the same as the incident light. During daytime when the sun is relatively high in the sky, tropospheric clouds generally appear bright white on top with varying shades of gray underneath. Thin clouds may look white or appear to have acquired the color of their environment or background. Red, orange, and pink clouds occur almost entirely at sunrise/sunset and are the result of the scattering of sunlight by the atmosphere. When the Sun is just below the horizon, low-level clouds are gray, middle clouds appear rose-colored, and high clouds are white or off-white. Clouds at night are black or dark gray in a moonless sky, or whitish when illuminated by the Moon. They may also reflect the colors of large fires, city lights, or auroras that might be present.

A cumulonimbus cloud that appears to have a greenish or bluish tint is a sign that it contains extremely high amounts of water; hail or rain which scatter light in a way that gives the cloud a blue color. A green colorization occurs mostly late in the day when the sun is comparatively low in the sky and the incident sunlight has a reddish tinge that appears green when illuminating a very tall bluish cloud. Supercell type storms are more likely to be characterized by this but any storm can appear this way. Coloration such as this does not directly indicate that it is a severe thunderstorm, it only confirms its potential. Since a green/blue tint signifies copious amounts of water, a strong updraft to support it, high winds from the storm raining out, and wet hail; all elements that improve the chance for it to become severe, can all be inferred from this. In addition, the stronger the updraft is, the more likely the storm is to undergo tornadogenesis and to produce large hail and high winds.

Yellowish clouds may be seen in the troposphere in the late spring through early fall months during forest fire season. The yellow color is due to the presence of pollutants in the smoke. Yellowish clouds are caused by the presence of nitrogen dioxide and are sometimes seen in urban areas with high air pollution levels.

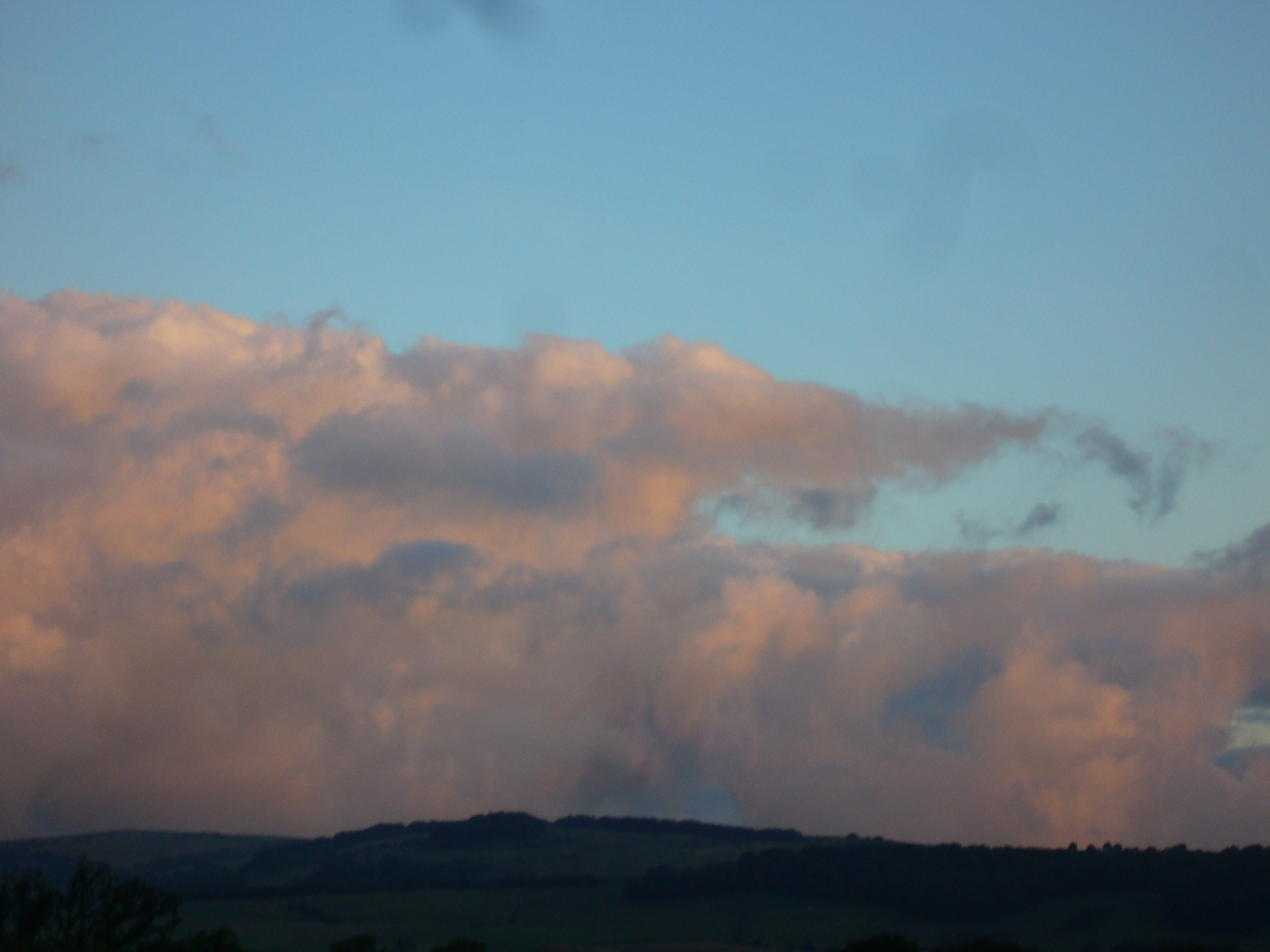
Stratocumulus stratiformis and small castellanus made orange by the sun rising

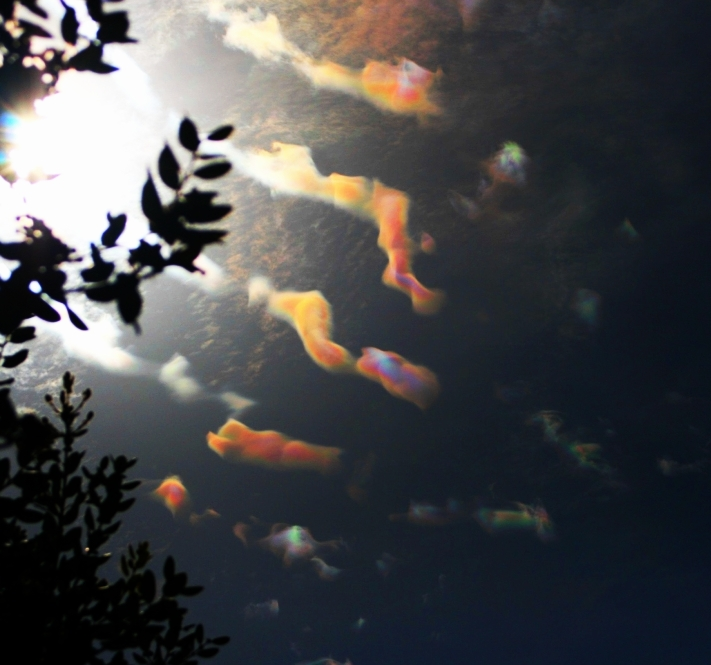
An occurrence of cloud iridescence with altocumulus volutus and cirrocumulus stratiformis

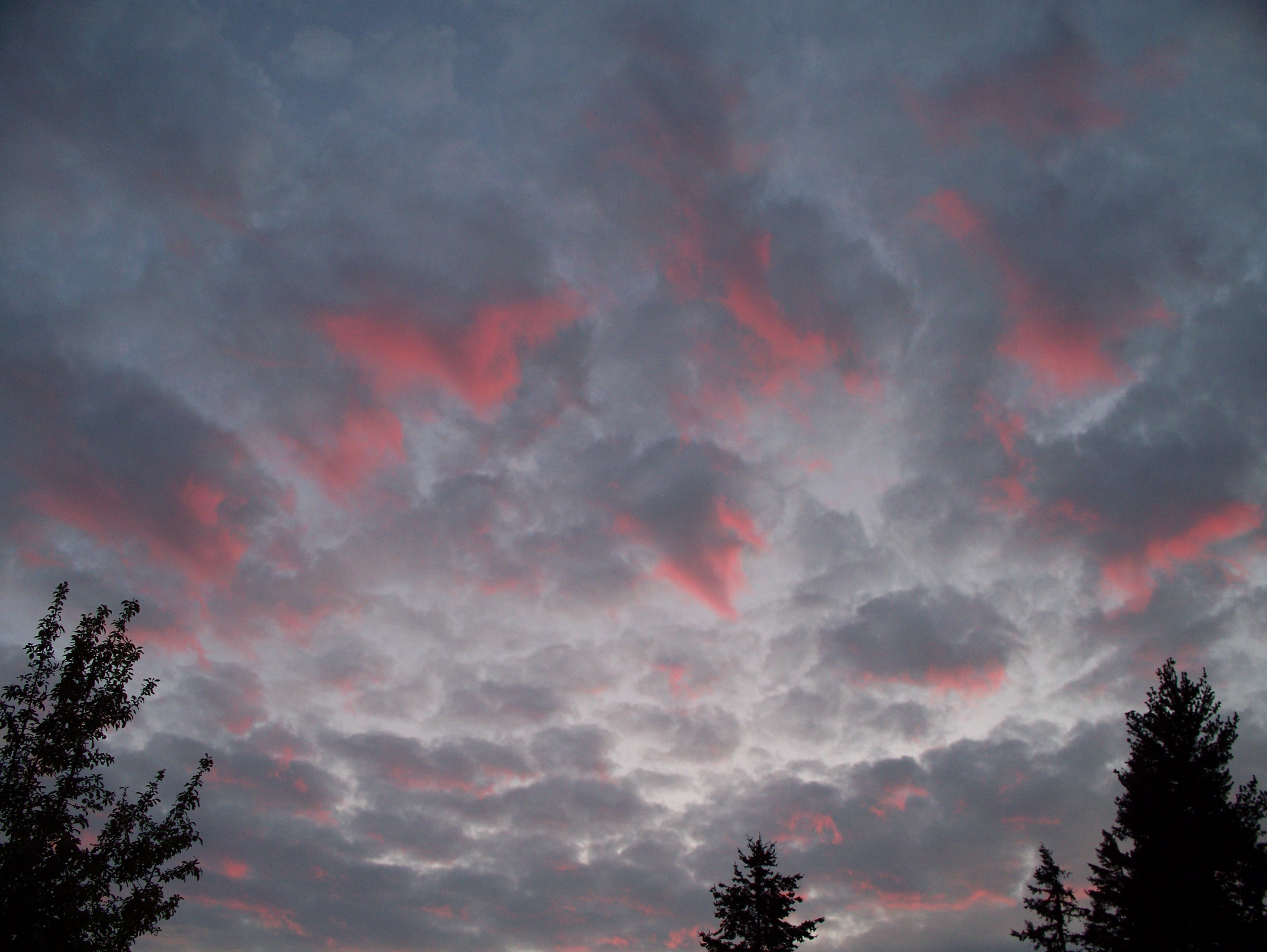
Sunset reflecting shades of pink onto gray stratocumulus stratiformis translucidus (becoming perlucidus in the background)

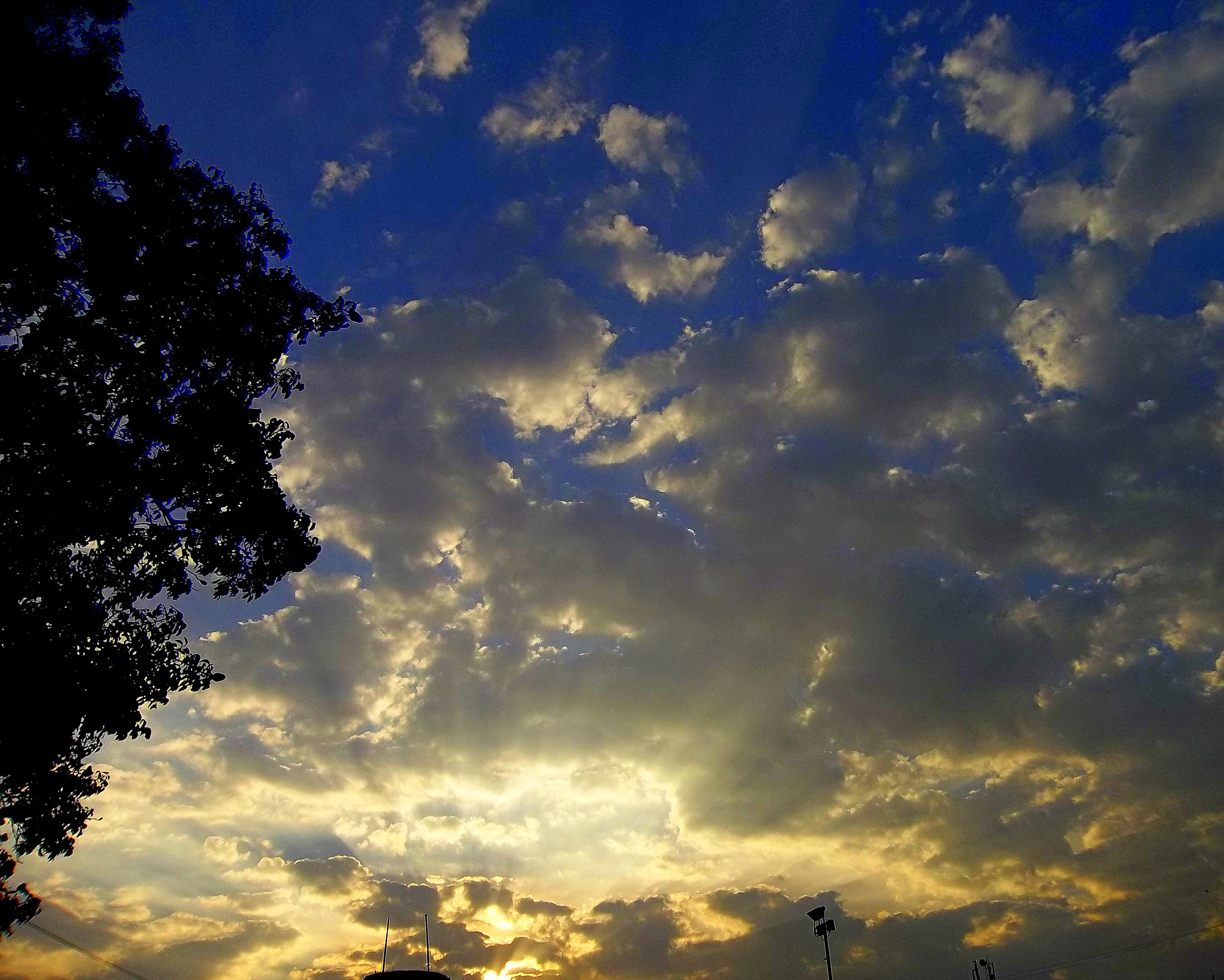
Stratocumulus stratiformis perlucidus before sunset in Bangalore, India

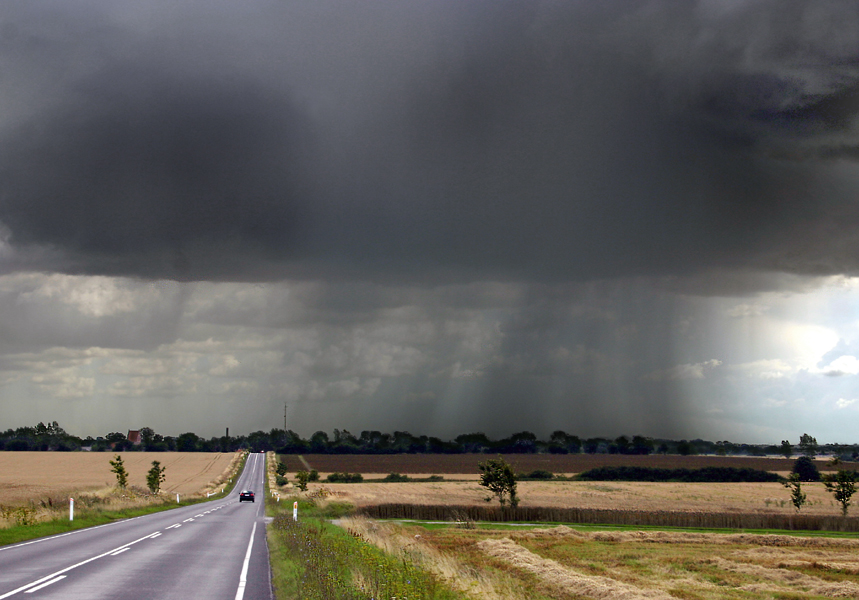
Late-summer rainstorm in Denmark. Nearly black color of base indicates main cloud in foreground probably cumulonimbus.

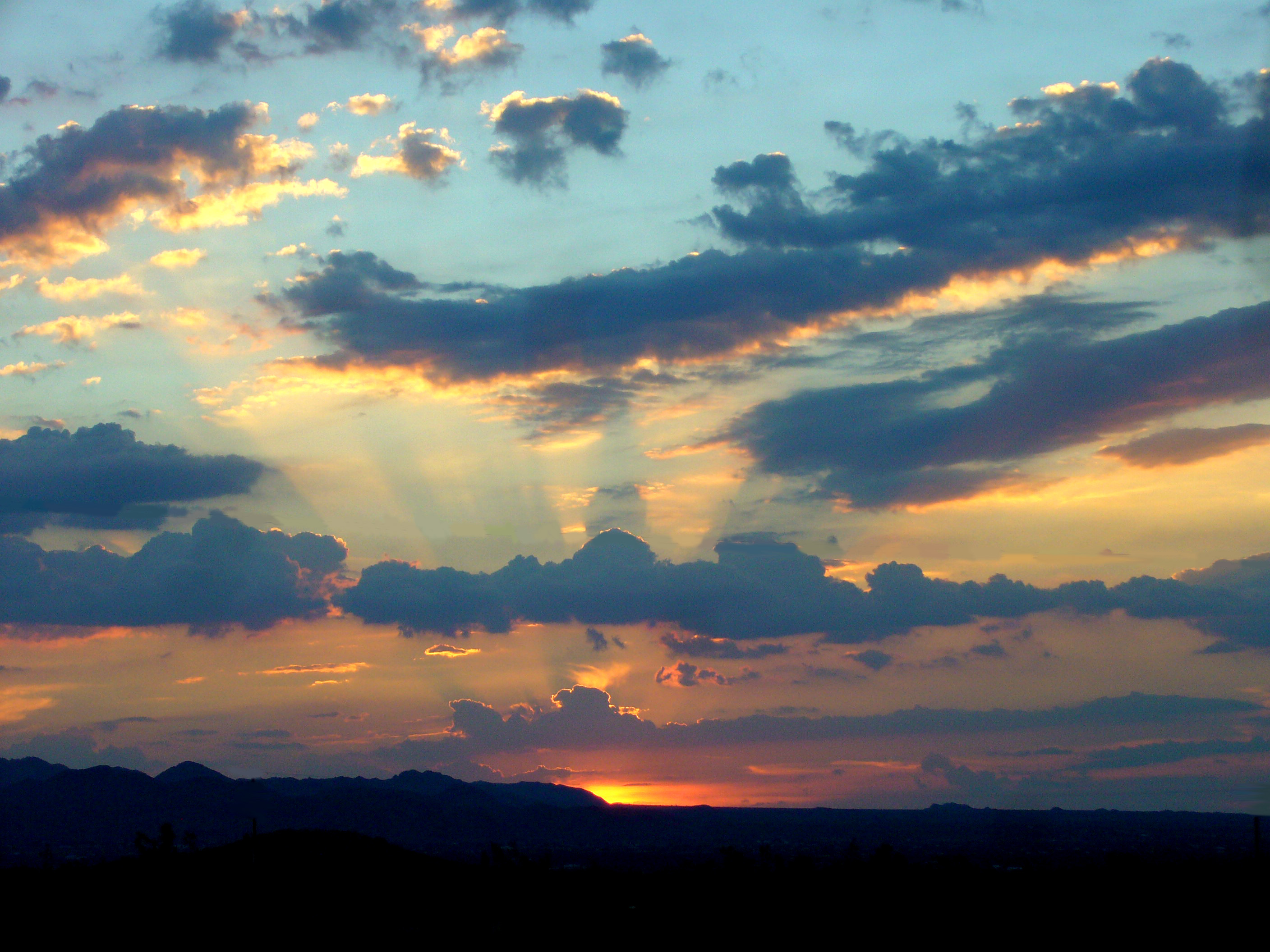
Particles in the atmosphere and the sun's angle enhance colors of stratocumulus cumulogenitus at evening twilight.

== Effects ==
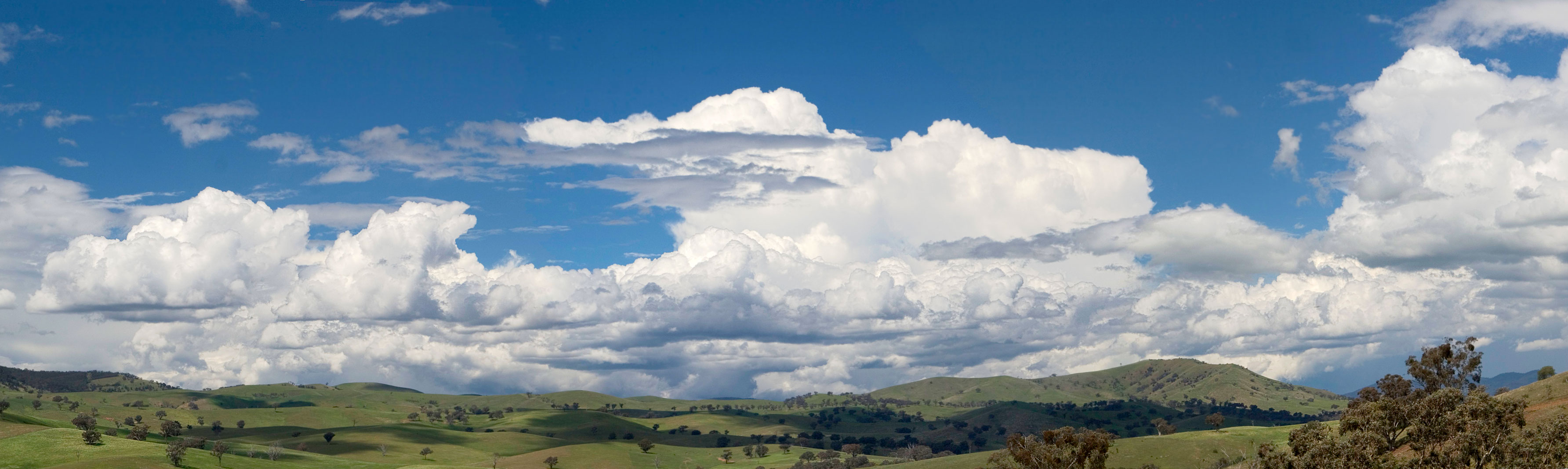
Cumuliform cloudscape over Swifts Creek, Australia

Tropospheric clouds exert numerous influences on Earth's troposphere and climate. First and foremost, they are the source of precipitation, thereby greatly influencing the distribution and amount of precipitation. Because of their differential buoyancy relative to surrounding cloud-free air, clouds can be associated with vertical motions of the air that may be convective, frontal, or cyclonic. The motion is upward if the clouds are less dense because condensation of water vapor releases heat, warming the air and thereby decreasing its density. This can lead to downward motion because lifting of the air results in cooling that increases its density. All of these effects are subtly dependent on the vertical temperature and moisture structure of the atmosphere and result in major redistribution of heat that affect the Earth's climate.

The complexity and diversity of clouds in the troposphere is a major reason for difficulty in quantifying the effects of clouds on climate and climate change. On the one hand, white cloud tops promote cooling of Earth's surface by reflecting shortwave radiation (visible and near infrared) from the Sun, diminishing the amount of solar radiation that is absorbed at the surface, enhancing the Earth's albedo. Most of the sunlight that reaches the ground is absorbed, warming the surface, which emits radiation upward at longer, infrared wavelengths. At these wavelengths, however, water in the clouds acts as an efficient absorber. The water reacts by radiating, also in the infrared, both upward and downward, and the downward longwave radiation results in increased warming at the surface. This is analogous to the greenhouse effect of greenhouse gases and water vapor.

High-level genus-types particularly show this duality with both short-wave albedo cooling and long-wave greenhouse warming effects. On the whole, ice-crystal clouds in the upper troposphere (cirrus) tend to favor net warming. However, the cooling effect is dominant with mid-level and low clouds, especially when they form in extensive sheets. Measurements by NASA indicate that, on the whole, the effects of low and mid-level clouds that tend to promote cooling outweigh the warming effects of high layers and the variable outcomes associated with vertically developed clouds.

As difficult as it is to evaluate the influences of current clouds on current climate, it is even more problematic to predict changes in cloud patterns and properties in a future, warmer climate, and the resultant cloud influences on future climate. In a warmer climate, more water would enter the atmosphere by evaporation at the surface; as clouds are formed from water vapor, cloudiness would be expected to increase. But in a warmer climate, higher temperatures would tend to evaporate clouds. Both of these statements are considered accurate, and both phenomena, known as cloud feedbacks, are found in climate model calculations. Broadly speaking, if clouds, especially low clouds, increase in a warmer climate, the resultant cooling effect leads to a negative feedback in climate response to increased greenhouse gases. But if low clouds decrease, or if high clouds increase, the feedback is positive. Differing amounts of these feedbacks are the principal reason for differences in climate sensitivities of current global climate models. As a consequence, much research has focused on the response of low and vertical clouds to a changing climate. Leading global models produce quite different results, however, with some showing increasing low clouds and others showing decreases. For these reasons the role of tropospheric clouds in regulating weather and climate remains a leading source of uncertainty in global warming projections.

== Stratospheric classification and distribution ==
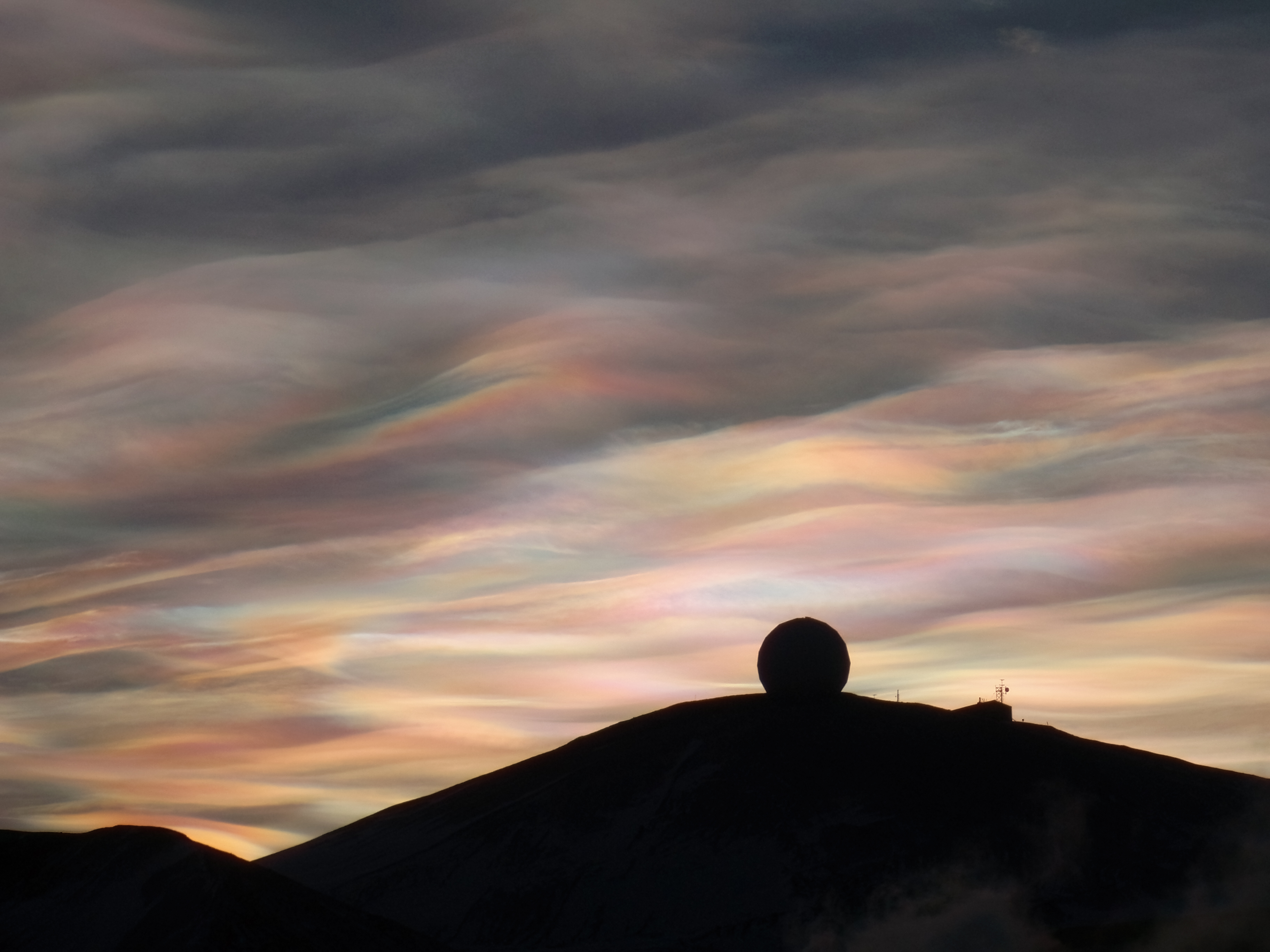
Lenticular nacreous clouds over Antarctica

Polar stratospheric clouds (PSC's) are found in the lowest part of the stratosphere. Moisture is scarce above the troposphere, so nacreous and non-nacreous clouds at this altitude range are restricted to polar regions in the winter where and when the air is coldest.

PSC's show some variation in structure according to their chemical makeup and atmospheric conditions, but are limited to a single very high range of altitude of about 15,000–25,000 m (49,200–82,000 ft) Accordingly, they are classified as a singular type with no differentiated altitude levels, genus types, species, or varieties. There is no Latin nomenclature in the manner of tropospheric clouds, but rather descriptive names of several general forms using common English.

Supercooled nitric acid and water PSC's, sometimes known as type 1, typically have a stratiform appearance resembling cirrostratus or haze, but because they are not frozen into crystals, do not show the pastel colors of the nacreous types. This type of PSC has been identified as a cause of ozone depletion in the stratosphere. The frozen nacreous types are typically very thin with mother-of-pearl colorations and an undulating cirriform or lenticular (stratocumuliform) appearance. These are sometimes known as type 2.

== Mesospheric classification and distribution ==
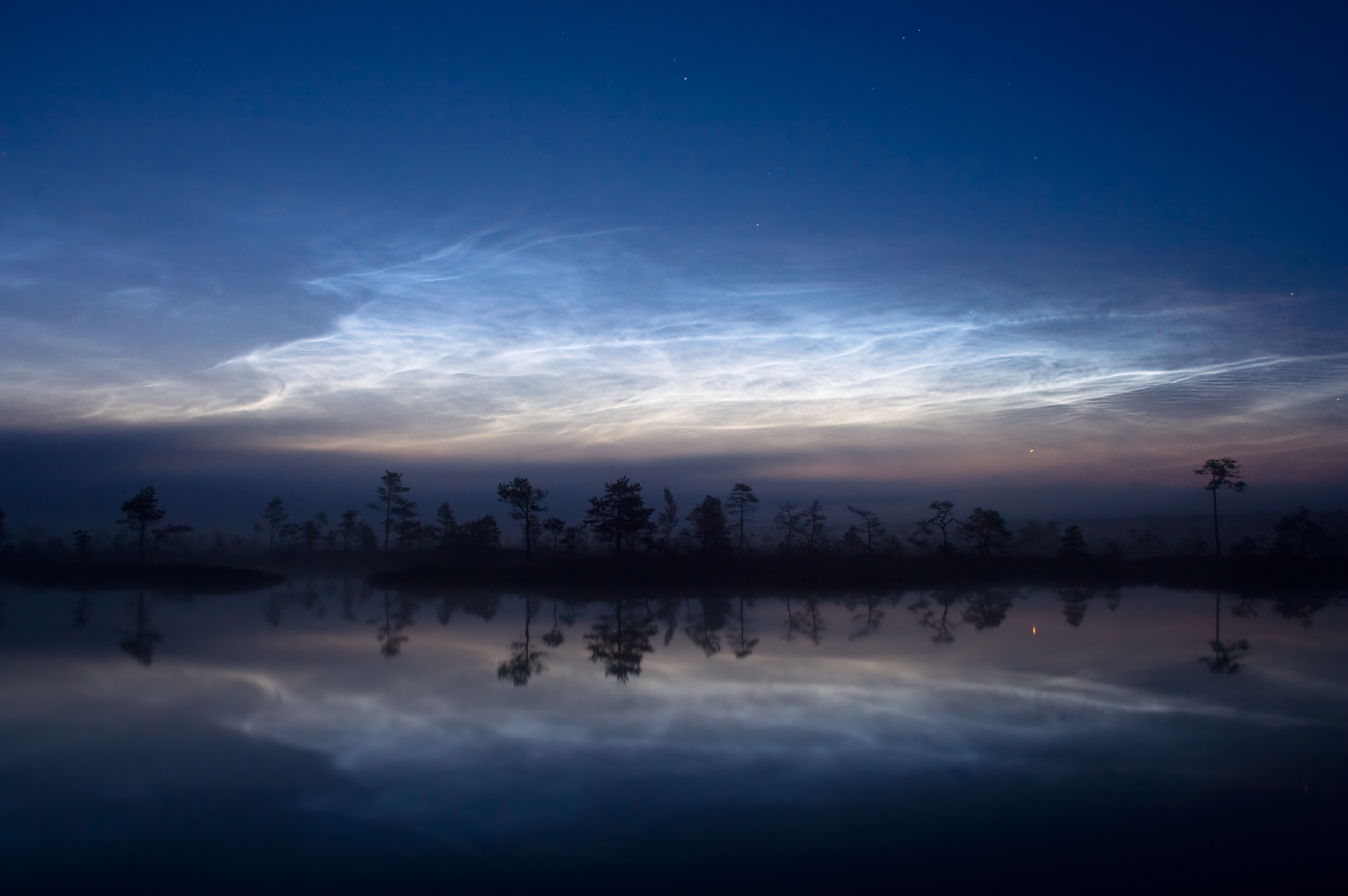
Noctilucent cloud over Estonia

Noctilucent clouds are the highest in the atmosphere and are found near the top of the mesosphere at about 80 to 85 km (50 to 53 mi) or roughly ten times the altitude of tropospheric high clouds. They are given this Latin derived name because of their illumination well after sunset and before sunrise. They typically have a bluish or silvery white coloration that can resemble brightly illuminated cirrus. Noctilucent clouds may occasionally take on more of a red or orange hue. They are not common or widespread enough to have a significant effect on climate. However, an increasing frequency of occurrence of noctilucent clouds since the 19th century may be the result of climate change.

Ongoing research indicates that convective lift in the mesosphere is strong enough during the polar summer to cause adiabatic cooling of small amount of water vapor to the point of saturation. This tends to produce the coldest temperatures in the entire atmosphere just below the mesopause. There is evidence that smoke particles from burnt-up meteors provide much of the condensation nuclei required for the formation of noctilucent cloud.

Noctilucent clouds have four major types based on physical structure and appearance. Type I veils are very tenuous and lack well-defined structure, somewhat like cirrostratus fibratus or poorly defined cirrus. Type II bands are long streaks that often occur in groups arranged roughly parallel to each other. They are usually more widely spaced than the bands or elements seen with cirrocumulus clouds. Type III billows are arrangements of closely spaced, roughly parallel short streaks that mostly resemble cirrus. Type IV whirls are partial or, more rarely, complete rings of cloud with dark centers.

Distribution in the mesosphere is similar to the stratosphere except at much higher altitudes. Because of the need for maximum cooling of the water vapor to produce noctilucent clouds, their distribution tends to be restricted to polar regions of Earth. Sightings are rare more than 45 degrees south of the North Pole or north of the South Pole.

== Extraterrestrial ==
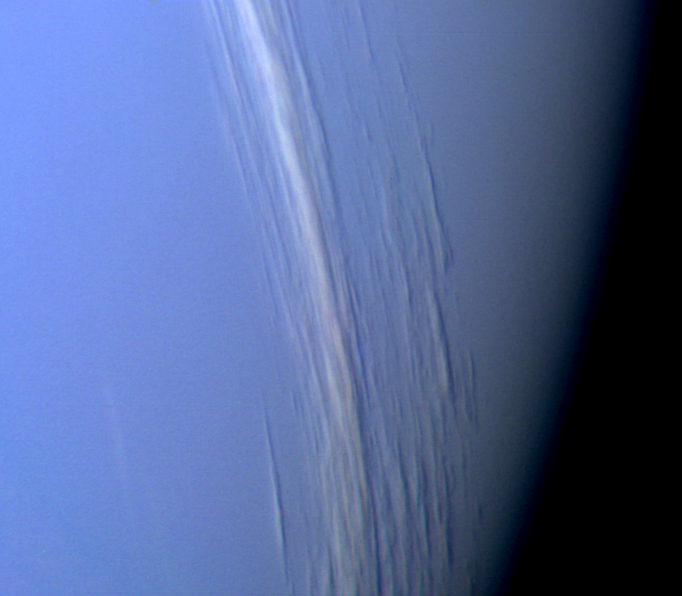
Cirrus clouds on Neptune, captured during Voyager 2's flyby

Cloud cover has been seen on most other planets in the Solar System. Venus's thick clouds are composed of sulfur dioxide (due to volcanic activity) and appear to be almost entirely stratiform. They are arranged in three main layers at altitudes of 45 to 65 km that obscure the planet's surface and can produce virga. No embedded cumuliform types have been identified, but broken stratocumuliform wave formations are sometimes seen in the top layer that reveal more continuous layer clouds underneath. On Mars, noctilucent, cirrus, cirrocumulus and stratocumulus composed of water-ice have been detected mostly near the poles. Water-ice fogs have also been detected on Mars.

Both Jupiter and Saturn have an outer cirriform cloud deck composed of ammonia, an intermediate stratiform haze-cloud layer made of ammonium hydrosulfide, and an inner deck of cumulus water clouds. Embedded cumulonimbus are known to exist near the Great Red Spot on Jupiter. The same category-types can be found covering Uranus and Neptune, but are all composed of methane. Saturn's moon Titan has cirrus clouds believed to be composed largely of methane. The Cassini–Huygens Saturn mission uncovered evidence of polar stratospheric clouds.

Some planets outside the Solar System are known to have atmospheric clouds. In 2013, the detection of high altitude optically thick clouds in the atmosphere of exoplanet Kepler-7b was announced, and, in December 2013, in the atmospheres of GJ 436 b and GJ 1214 b.

== In culture and religion ==
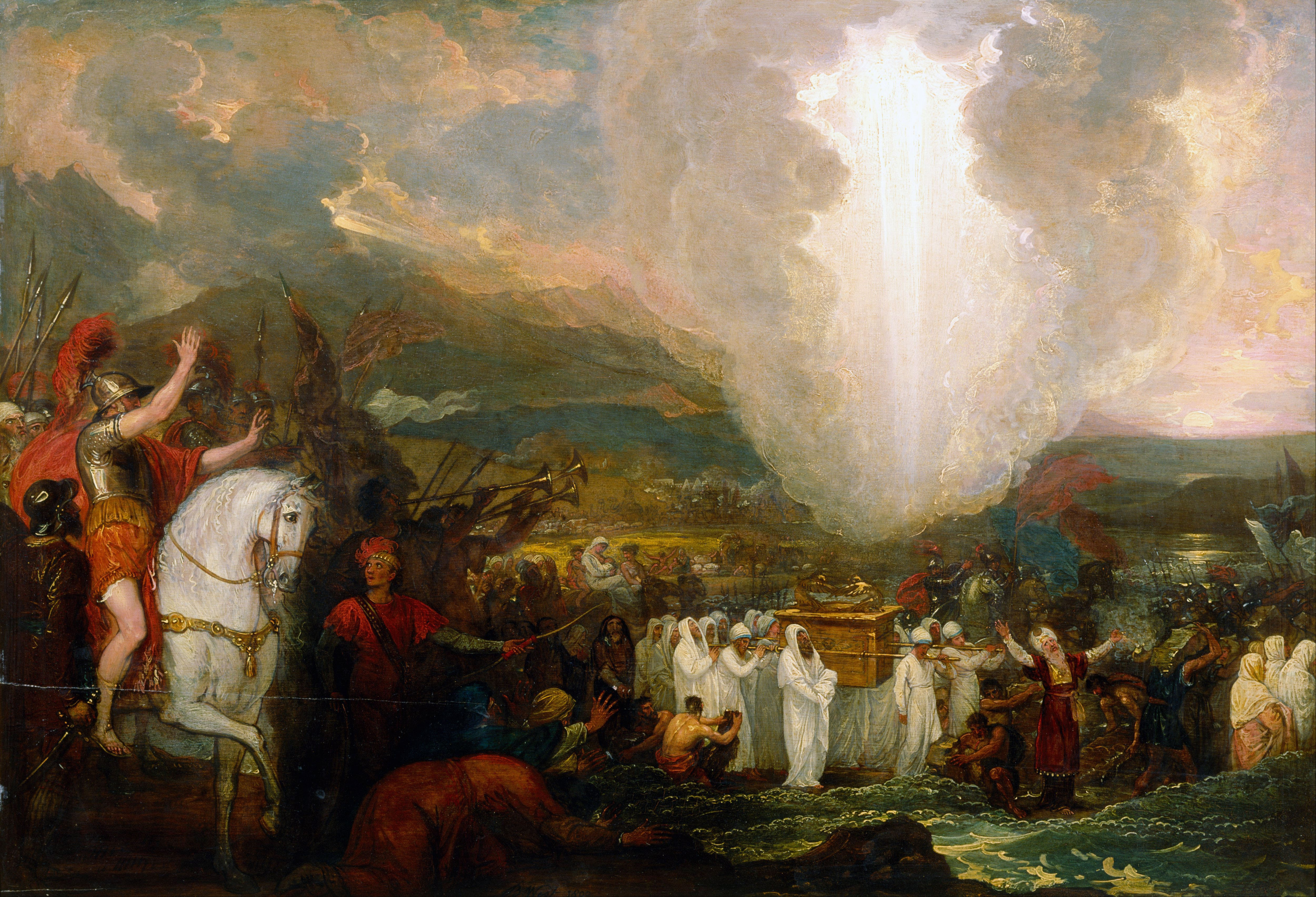
Joshua Passing the River Jordan with the Ark of the Covenant (1800) by Benjamin West, showing Yahweh leading the Israelites through the desert in the form of a pillar of cloud

Clouds play an important mythical or non-scientific role in various cultures and religious traditions. The ancient Akkadians believed that the clouds (in meteorology, probably the supplementary feature mamma) were the breasts of the sky goddess Antu, and that rain was milk from her breasts. In the Book of Exodus, Yahweh is described as guiding the Israelites through the desert in the form of a "pillar of cloud" by day and a "pillar of fire" by night. In Mandaeism, uthras (celestial beings) are occasionally mentioned as being in anana ("clouds"), which can also be interpreted as female consorts.

In the ancient Greek comedy The Clouds, written by Aristophanes and first performed at the City Dionysia in 423 BC, the philosopher Socrates declares that the Clouds are the only true deities and tells the main character Strepsiades not to worship any deities other than the Clouds, but to pay homage to them alone. In the play, the Clouds change shape to reveal the true nature of whoever is looking at them. They are hailed the source of inspiration to comic poets and philosophers; they are masters of rhetoric, regarding eloquence and sophistry alike as their "friends".

In Shakespeare's Hamlet, the prince mocks the courtier Polonius' sycophancy by pointing out various incompatible shapes in the same cloud, to which Polonius readily agrees every time.

In China, clouds are symbols of luck and happiness. Overlapping clouds are thought to imply eternal happiness and clouds of different colors are said to indicate "multiplied blessings".

Informal cloud watching or cloud gazing is a popular activity involving watching the clouds and looking for shapes in them, a form of pareidolia.

== See also ==
- Atmospheric Radiation Measurement (ARM) (US)
- Bioprecipitation
- Ceiling
- Cloud albedo
- Cloud Appreciation Society
- Cloud cover
- Cloud forcing
- Cloud seeding
- Clouds (sculpture)
- Cloudscape (art)
- Cloudscape photography
- Coalescence
- Extraterrestrial sky
- Fog
- Mist
- Mushroom cloud
- Pileus (meteorology)
- Precipitation
- Sunshine duration
- Undulatus asperatus
- Weather lore

== Bibliography ==
- Ackerman, Steven A. (2011). Meteorology: Clouds and the Greenhouse Effect. Jones & Bartlett. ISBN 978-0-7637-8927-5.
- Dunlop, Storm (June 2003). The Weather Identification Handbook. Lyons Press. ISBN 978-1-58574-857-0.
- IPCC (2021). Masson-Delmotte, V.; Zhai, P.; Pirani, A.; Connors, S. L.; et al. (eds.). Climate Change 2021: The Physical Science Basis (PDF). Contribution of Working Group I to the Sixth Assessment Report of the Intergovernmental Panel on Climate Change. Cambridge University Press.
