= International Cloud Atlas =

Cloud atlas

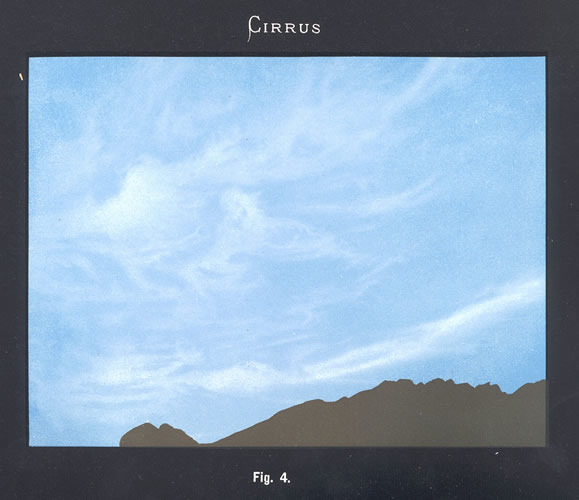
Cirrus clouds, as illustrated in the first figure of the first International Cloud Atlas

The International Cloud Atlas or simply the Cloud Atlas, is a cloud atlas that was first published in 1896 and has remained in print since. Its initial purposes included aiding the training of meteorologists and promoting more consistent use of vocabulary describing clouds, which were both important for early weather forecasting. The first edition featured color plates of color photographs, then still a very new technology, but noted for being expensive. Numerous later editions have been published.

== First edition ==
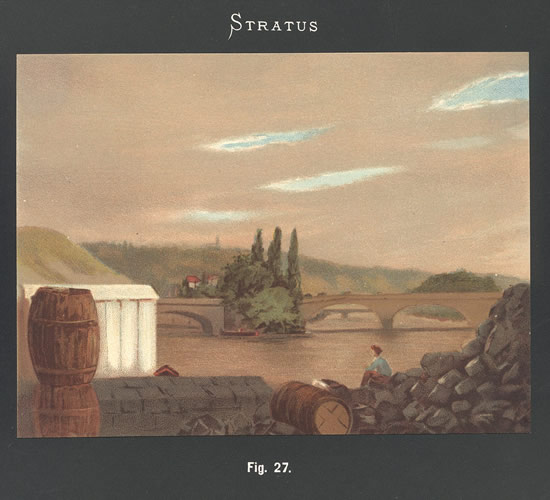
Painting of stratus clouds from the 1896 edition

Publication of the first edition was arranged by Hugo Hildebrand Hildebrandsson, Albert Riggenbach, and Léon Teisserenc de Bort, members of the Clouds Commission of the International Meteorological Committee aka International Meteorological Organization (now the World Meteorological Organization). It consists of color plates of clouds, and text in English, French, and German. Consequently, it had separate title pages in each language and is known also by its alternate titles Atlas international des nuages and Internationaler Wolkenatlas. These were selected by the Clouds Commission, which also included Julius von Hann, Henrik Mohn, and Abbott Lawrence Rotch.

The first edition featured printed color plates, rather than hand-colored plates. Most of the plates were color photographs, but also some paintings. A cirrus cloud was the first type of cloud illustrated, from a color photograph. At the time, color photography was new, complicated, and expensive. Consequently, the Clouds Commission was unable to obtain suitable color photographs of all the cloud types, and they selected paintings to use as substitutes.

The first edition was inspired in part by the observation of the English meteorologist Ralph Abercromby that clouds were of the same general kinds everywhere in the world. Abercromby and Hildebrandsson developed a new classification of clouds that was published in an earlier atlas, the 1890 Cloud Atlas by Hugo Hildebrand Hildebrandsson, Wladimir Köppen, and Georg von Neumayer. Other, similar works published prior to this were M. Weilbach's Nordeuropas Sky-former (Copenhagen, 1881), M. Singer's Wolkentafeln (Munich, 1892), Classificazione delle nubi by the Specola Vaticana (Rome, 1893), and the Rev. W. Clement Ley's Cloudland (London, 1894).

== Later editions ==
International Cloud Atlas has been published in multiple editions since 1896, including 1911, 1932, 1939, 1956, 1975, 1987 and 2017. The 1932 edition was titled International Atlas of Clouds and of States of the Sky. It was published in Catalan (Atles Internacional dels Núvols i dels Estats del cel) besides the three International Meteorological Organization official languages (English, French and German) because Mr. Rafel Patxot, a member of the scientific committee that collaborated with the Meteorological Service of Catalonia, sponsored the whole publication. The 1939 edition modified the title to International Atlas of Clouds and Types of Skies. The 1956 edition was the first published in two volumes, separating text and plates. This lowered costs and facilitated the publication of translated editions. It was translated into Polish in 1959 (Międzynarodowy atlas chmur; atlas skrócony) and Norwegian in 1958 (Internasjonalt skyatlas 1956). A Dutch translation was published in 1967 (Wolkenatlas. Bewerkt naar de Internationale verkorte wolkenatlas van de Meteorologische Wereldorganisatie).

=== 1975 edition ===
The 1975 edition was published in two volumes 12 years apart: Volume I (text) in 1975 and Volume II (plates) in 1987. Its innovations included a new chapter describing clouds from above, as from aircraft. Also, the former classification of hydrometeors was replaced by a classification of meteors, in which the hydrometeors are one group:

- Hydrometeor: an ensemble of liquid or solid water particles suspended in, or falling through, the atmosphere, blown by the wind from the Earth's surface, or deposited on objects on the ground or in free air.
- Lithometeor: an ensemble of particles most of which are solid and non-aqueous. The particles are more or less suspended in the air, or lifted by the wind from the ground.
- Photometeor: a luminous phenomenon produced by the reflection, refraction, diffraction or interference of light from the sun or the moon.
- Electrometeor: a visible or audible manifestation of atmospheric electricity.

=== 2017 edition ===
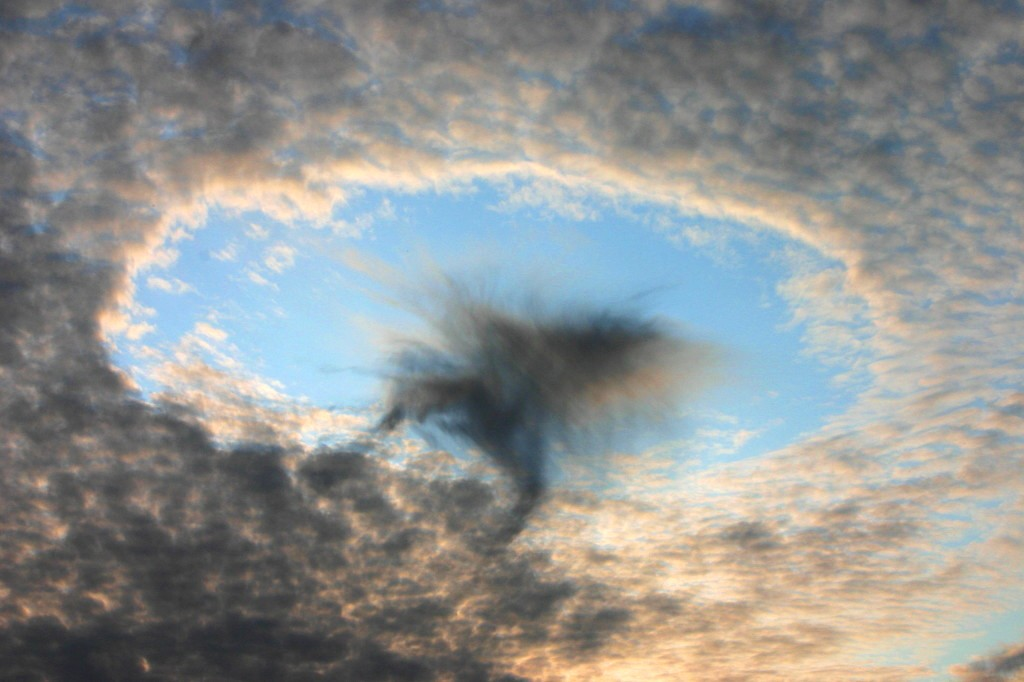
Cavum over Austria

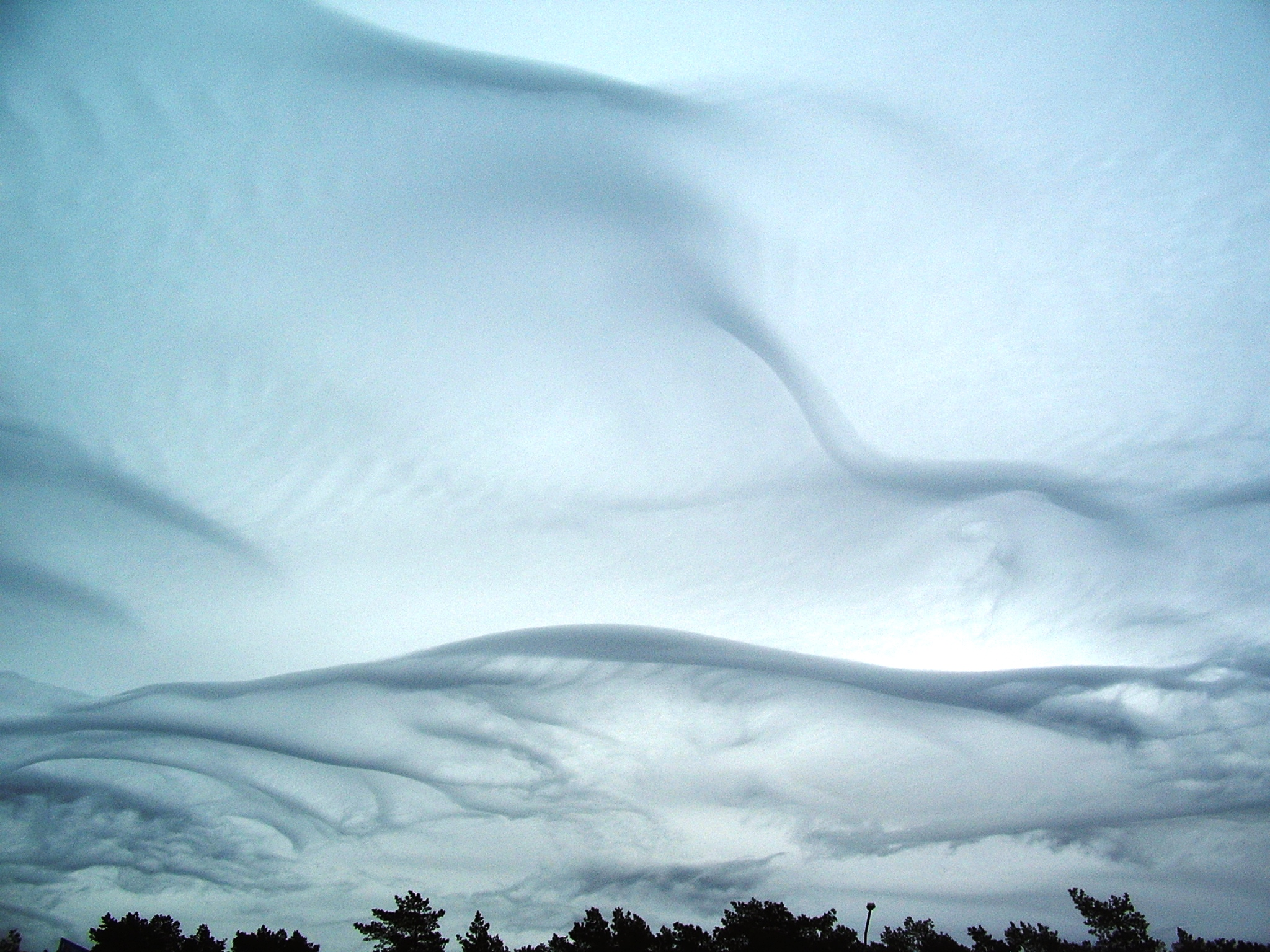
Asperitas over Tallinn, Estonia

The 2017 edition of the International Cloud Atlas has added 12 new cloud formations – one new species, five new supplemental features, one new accessory cloud type, and five new special clouds. The 2017 edition of the atlas is available online. Its additions comprised the following:

Species

- Volutus: more widely known as roll clouds, a relatively rare formation influenced by wind shear.

Supplemental features

- Asperitas: wave-like billowing clouds with an "underwater" appearance
- Cavum: commonly termed "hole in a cloud", "fallstreak hole", or "hole punch cloud", formed by ice crystals falling from a higher-altitude cloud of supersaturated liquid water droplets, leaving a round hole
- Murus: a new formal name for the "wall cloud", seen at the base of supercell thunderstorms
- Cauda: a tail-like supplemental feature associated with wall clouds
- Fluctus: Kelvin-Helmholtz instability waves

Accessory cloud type

- Flumen: known as "beaver's tail", a type of trailing cloud associated with the inflow boundary of strong thunderstorms

Special clouds

Particular phenomena were given official cloud names by the WMO in 2017:

- Cataractagenitus: waterfall spray
- Flammagenitus: clouds formed by intense heat; pyrocumulus
- Homogenitus: clouds formed by human activity, including aircraft contrails, ship tracks, and cooling tower fog
- Homomutatus: clouds that evolve from Homogenitus into persistent cloud cover
- Silvagenitus: clouds associated with cloud forests and from evapotranspiration above a forest canopy

== Reception ==
One reviewer of the 1896 edition noted that "The illustrations are beautifully colored, and quite apart from its great value to meteorology, the 'Cloud Atlas' is well worth owning for the beauty of the illustrations alone."

The following year, a derivative cloud atlas was published in the United States through the Government Printing Office, titled Illustrative cloud forms for the guidance of observers in the classification of clouds. A reviewer noted "We are not sure that it is desirable that there should be several cloud atlases in existence concurrently; but, probably, administrative difficulties would be raised if in any country copies of the International Cloud Atlas were purchased sufficient in number to supply an entire navy. This, probably, is the reason for the appearance of the present artistic little volume." It copied the International Cloud Atlas, except that it substituted color lithographs.

The International Cloud Atlas was revised numerous times in response to requirements of its principal user community, meteorologists. Nonetheless, it was not sufficient for all users, and consequently a number of other cloud atlases and critiques have been published. A 1901 popular German book about the weather reproduced photographs from the International Cloud Atlas, and one reviewer of the 1901 book judged these reproductions to be its best feature. Atlas photographique des nuages, a 1912 cloud atlas of grayscale photographs, was praised for its sharp photographs but criticized for not following the International Cloud Classification. The 1923 book, A Cloud Atlas, despite its title is not a cloud atlas. The author, the American meteorologist Alexander George McAdie, then director of the Blue Hill Meteorological Observatory, advocated a classification of clouds that was not typological but rather predictive: a classification that did not merely describe what was before the observer. As McAdie put it, when we look at a cloud we want to know, not what it resembles, but whether it portends fair or foul weather. The book is a discussion of what characteristics of clouds such a classification might take into account.

== See also ==
- Luke Howard, "namer of the clouds"
- Cloud species
- Timeline of meteorology
- World Meteorological Organization
