= Albert Riggenbach =

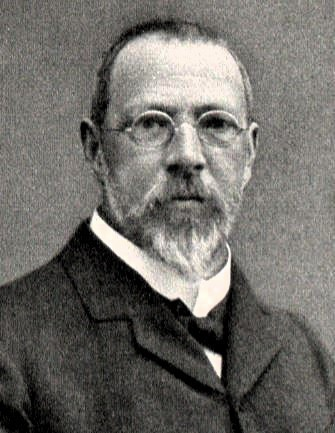
- Born: 22 August 1854; Basel
- Died: 28 February 1921 (aged 66); Basel
- Alma mater: University of Basel; University of Tübingen
- Occupation: Meteorologist; physicist
- Works: International Cloud Atlas

Albert Riggenbach (22 August 1854 – 28 February 1921), also known as Albert Riggenbach-Burckhardt, was a Swiss meteorologist and co-author, with Hugo Hildebrandsson and Léon Teisserenc de Bort, of one of the first cloud atlases, the International Cloud Atlas in 1896. His doctoral dissertation (Habilitationsschrift) concerned observations of the first described Bishop's Ring.

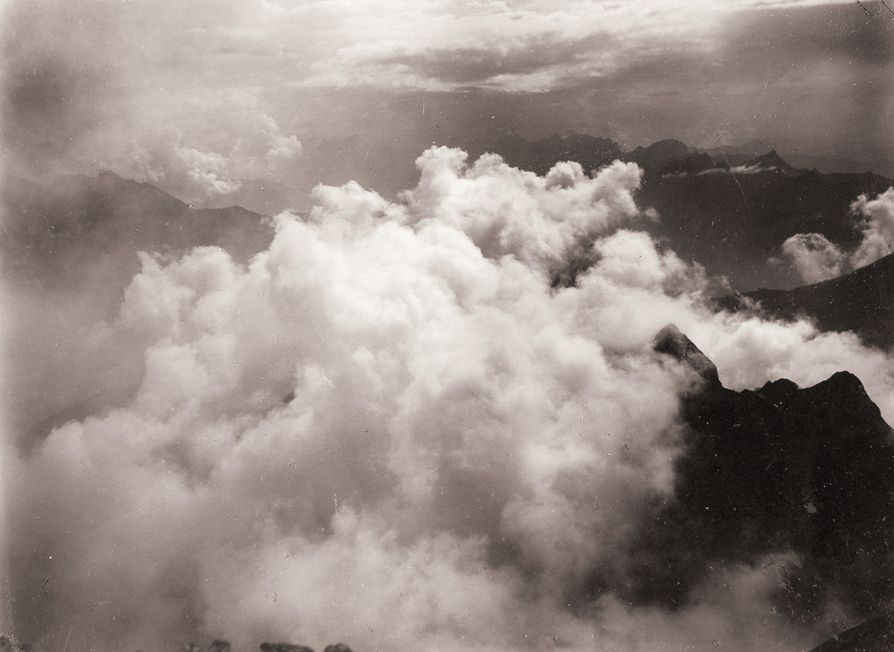
Cumulus. Photo by Albert Riggenbach. Ca. 1895

A great nephew of Swiss architect Achilles Huber, he married in 1883 Valerie Burckhardt, daughter of Daniel Burckhardt, descending from an influential family of Basel. In 1880, he became assistant for Astronomy and Meteorology at the Physics Institute in Basel and was professor at the University of Basel between 1899 and 1914. In the 1890s, Riggenbach also took the first successful pictures of cirrus clouds, some of which appeared in the 1896 cloud atlas he co-authored.

== Bibliography ==
- 1886 Beobachtungen über die Dämmerung, insbesondere über das Purpurlicht und seine Beziehungen zum Bishop'schen Sonnenring
- 1896 International Cloud Atlas
