= Cloud atlas =

Compendium of cloud types

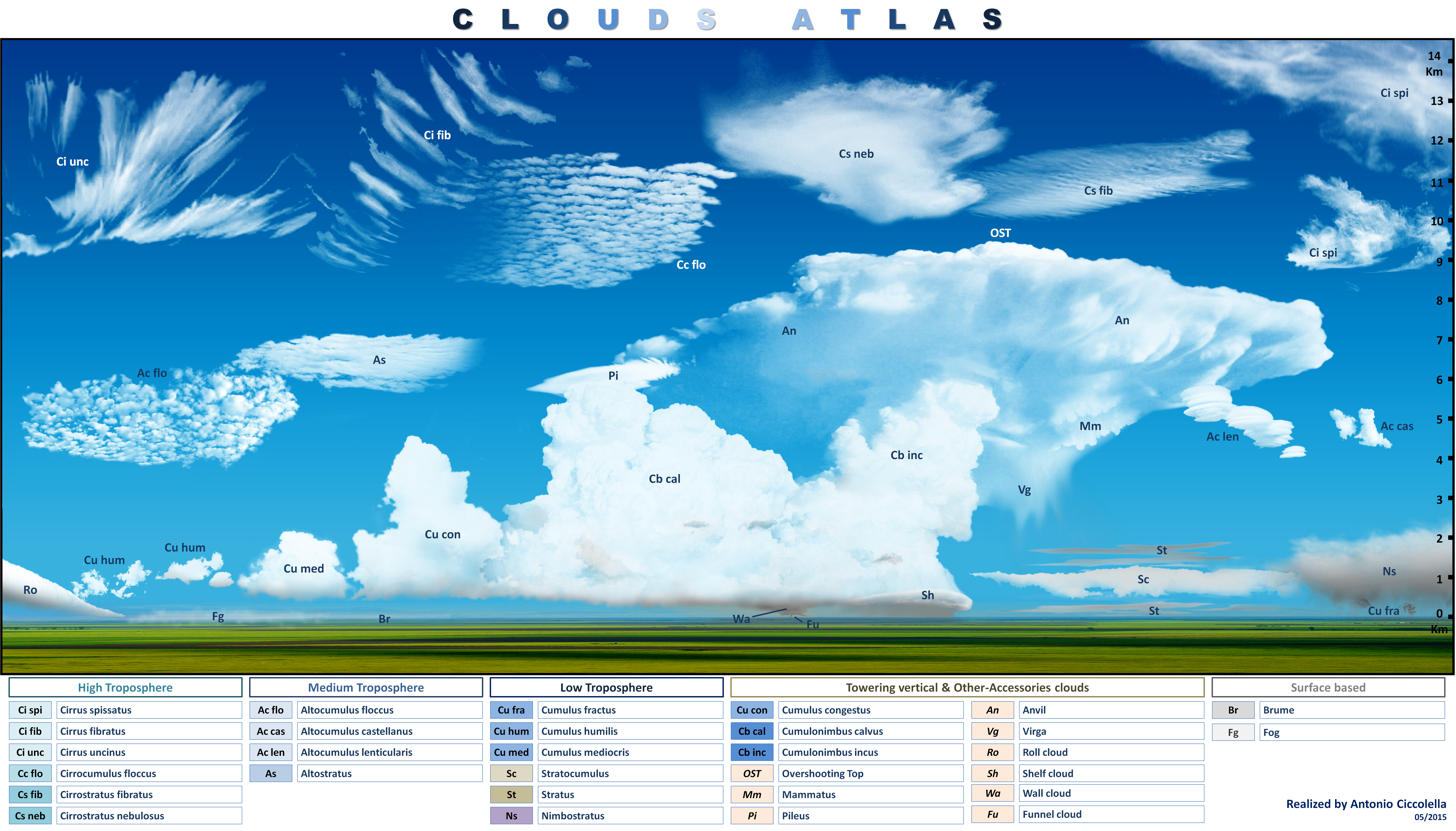
An example of a Cloud Atlas

A cloud atlas is a pictorial key (or an atlas) to the nomenclature of clouds. Early cloud atlases were an important element in the training of meteorologists and in weather forecasting, and the author of a 1923 atlas stated that "increasing use of the air as a means of transportation will require and lead to a detailed knowledge of all the secrets of cloud building."

== History ==
Throughout the 19th century, nomenclatures and classifications of cloud types were developed, followed late in the century by cloud atlases. The first nomenclature of clouds in English was published by Luke Howard in 1802. It followed a similar effort in French by Jean-Baptiste Lamarck in 1801. Howard's nomenclature defined four fundamental types of clouds: cirrus or thread-cloud, cumulus or heap-cloud, stratus or flat cloud (level sheet), and nimbus or rain-cloud (see List of cloud types).

There followed a long period of development of the field of meteorology and the classification of clouds. In the late 19th century, Clement Ley and Ralph Abercromby contributed to building a classification for clouds. Ley's book, Cloudland, was influential among meteorologists, while Abercromby wrote scientific papers on the subject, stressing that clouds are the same everywhere in the world (a novel observation at the time). Abercromby also collaborated with Hugo Hildebrand Hildebrandsson to propose a detailed classification of clouds, which was adopted in Hildebrandsson's 1890 Cloud Atlas. In 1891 the International Meteorological Conference at Munich recommended the general adoption of Abercromby and Hildebrandsson's classification system. The year 1896 was declared International Year of Clouds.

The first International Cloud Atlas was published in 1896, to coincide with another International Meteorological Conference. It was a political and technical triumph, and an immediate de facto standard. The scientific photography of clouds required several technical advances, including faster films (shorter exposures), color, and sufficient contrast between cloud and sky. Albert Riggenbach used a Nicol prism to filter polarized light, thereby increasing the contrast. Other researchers achieved similar results using mirrors or lake surfaces, and selectively photographing in certain parts of the sky.

Many subsequent editions of International Cloud Atlas were published, including editions in 1906 and 1911. Several other cloud atlases appeared, including in 1908 M. J. Vincent's Atlas des Nuages (known in English as Vincent's Cloud Atlas), which was based on the 1906 International Cloud Atlas, but with additions, and it classified the clouds into three group by height of the cloud base above ground: lower, middle, upper.

== Notable cloud atlases ==
The 1890 Cloud Atlas is the first known cloud atlas and book of this title, by Hildebrandsson, Wladimir Köppen, and Georg von Neumayer. It was an expensive quarto book of chromolithographs reproducing 10 color oil paintings and 12 photographs for comparison, and was designed to explore the advantages and disadvantages of photography for the scientific illustration of cloud forms. Its printing was limited but as a proof of concept it was a great success, leading directly to the International Cloud Atlas.

The first International Cloud Atlas was published in 1896. This was prepared by Hildebrandsson, Riggenbach, and Leon Teisserenc de Bort, members of the Clouds Commission of the International Meteorological Committee. It consists of color plates of clouds, mostly photographs but some paintings, and text in French, English, and German. The plates were selected from among 300 of the best color photographs of clouds provided by members of the commission. The atlas has remained in print since then, in multiple editions.

== See also ==
- Classification
- List of cloud types
- Timeline of meteorology
