= Cloud atlas (disambiguation) =

A cloud atlas is a pictorial key to the nomenclature of clouds.

- International Cloud Atlas (1896), the first international cloud atlas
- A Cloud Atlas (1923), by Alexander George McAdie

Cloud Atlas may also refer to:

== Literature ==
- Cloud Atlas (2002), a collection of poems by Donald Platt
- Cloud Atlas (novel), a 2004 novel by David Mitchell
- The Cloud Atlas (2004), a novel by Liam Callanan

== Film ==
- Cloud Atlas (film), a 2012 film based on David Mitchell's 2004 novel

== Music ==
- Cloud Atlas (1985-1999), a series of compositions by musician Toshi Ichiyanagi
- International Cloud Atlas, a 2007 album by Mikel Rouse
