= Lithometeor =

Type of meteor

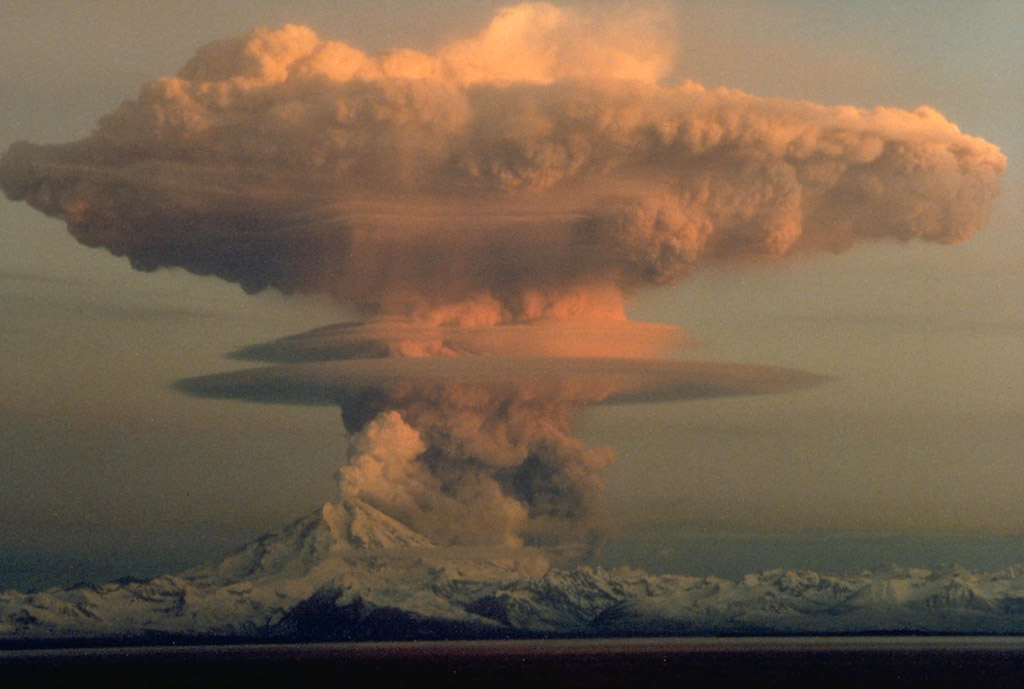
Large ash cloud from the Mount Redoubt volcano.

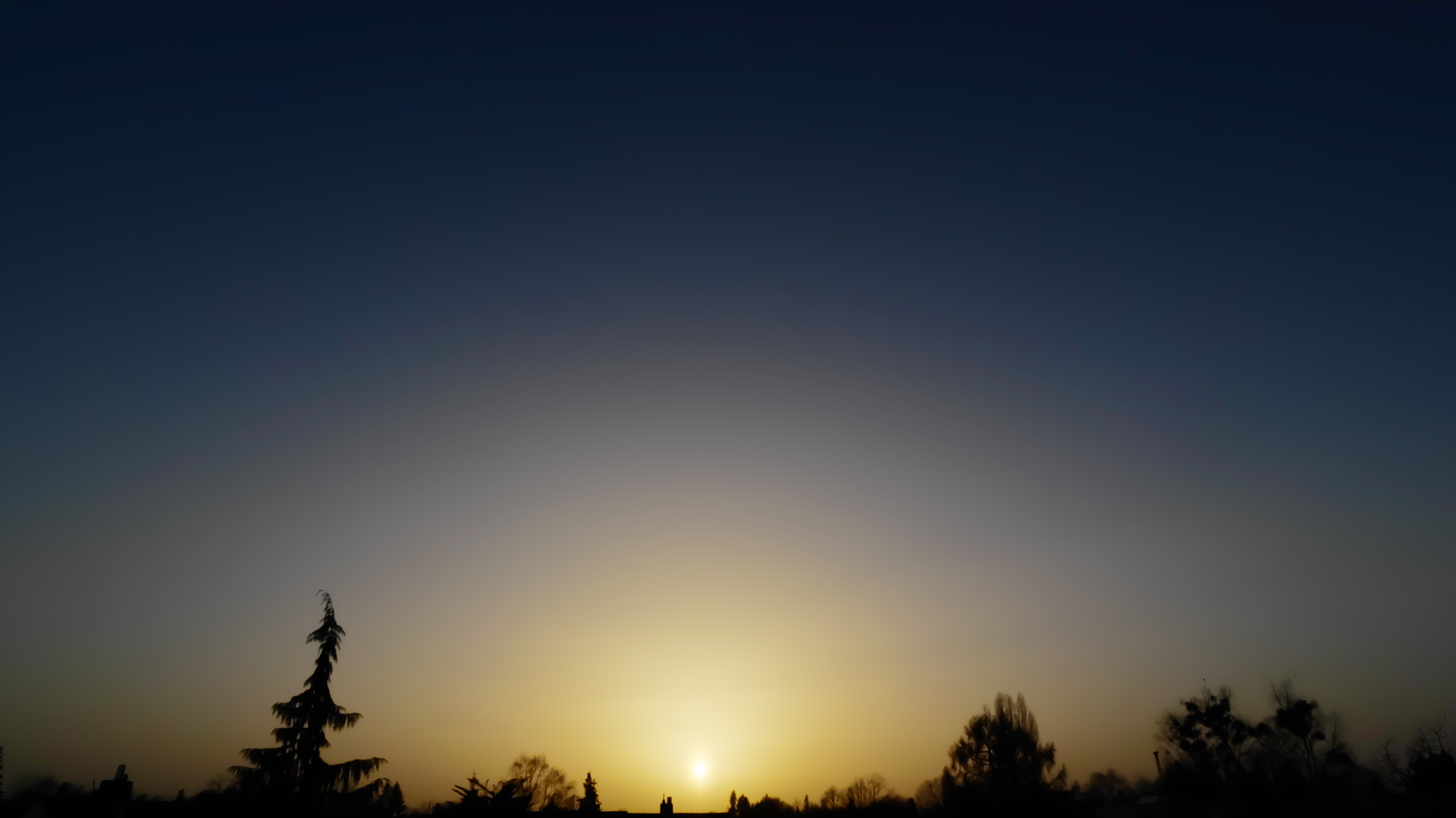
Lithometeor at sunset in Berlin on February 25, 2021, cloudless sky with Saharan dust.

Lithometeors are meteors that are observed in the atmosphere on the earth's surface or in the sky in the field of meteorology. The name is derived from “litho”, ancient Greek λίθος [líthos] for “stone” (note: including in the sense of sand and dust), and “meteor”, from ancient Greek μετέωρος [metéōros], “floating in the air”. Unlike electrometeors, hydrometeors and photometeors, they are associated with suspended particles that are not made of water. Solid and liquid components of the atmosphere in whose composition water plays no or at least almost no role are also referred to as aerosols.

The following phenomena are lithometeors:

- Ash cloud
- Smoke
- Micrometeorites
- Dust storm
- Haze
- Tornado
