= Cloud iridescence =

Optical phenomenon

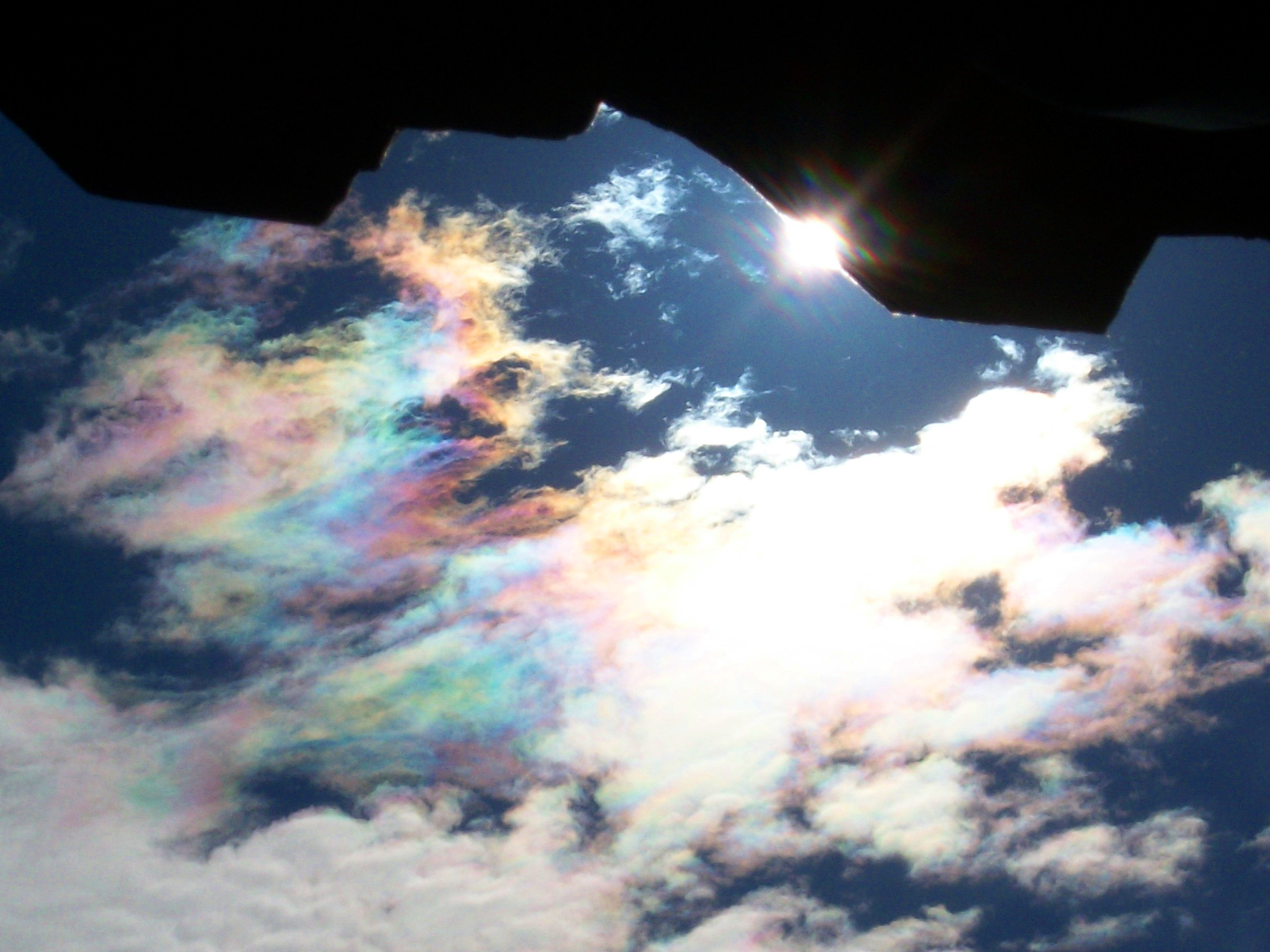
Iridescent mid altitude clouds

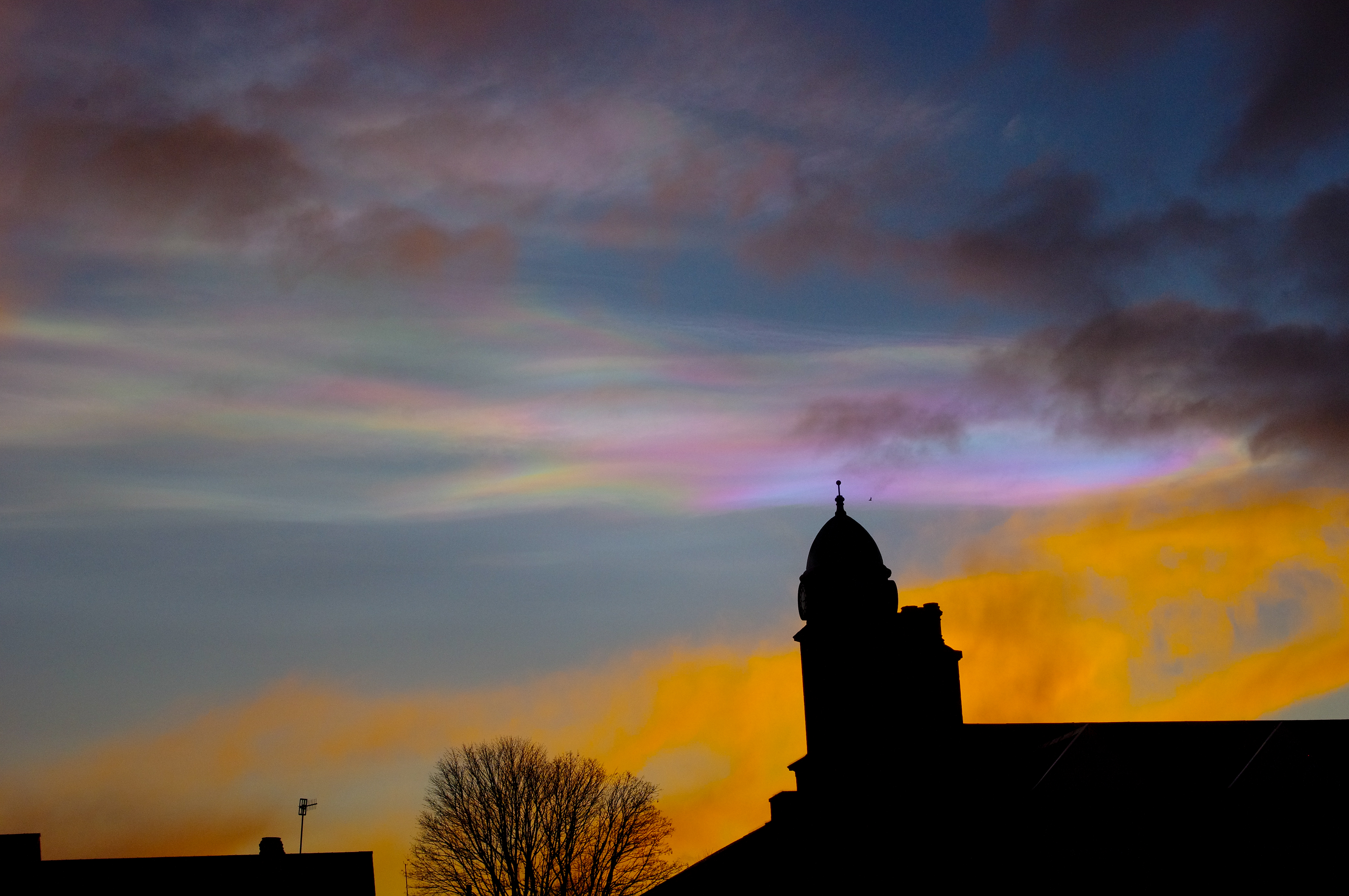
Iridescent polar stratospheric cloud at sunset over Aberdeen, Scotland

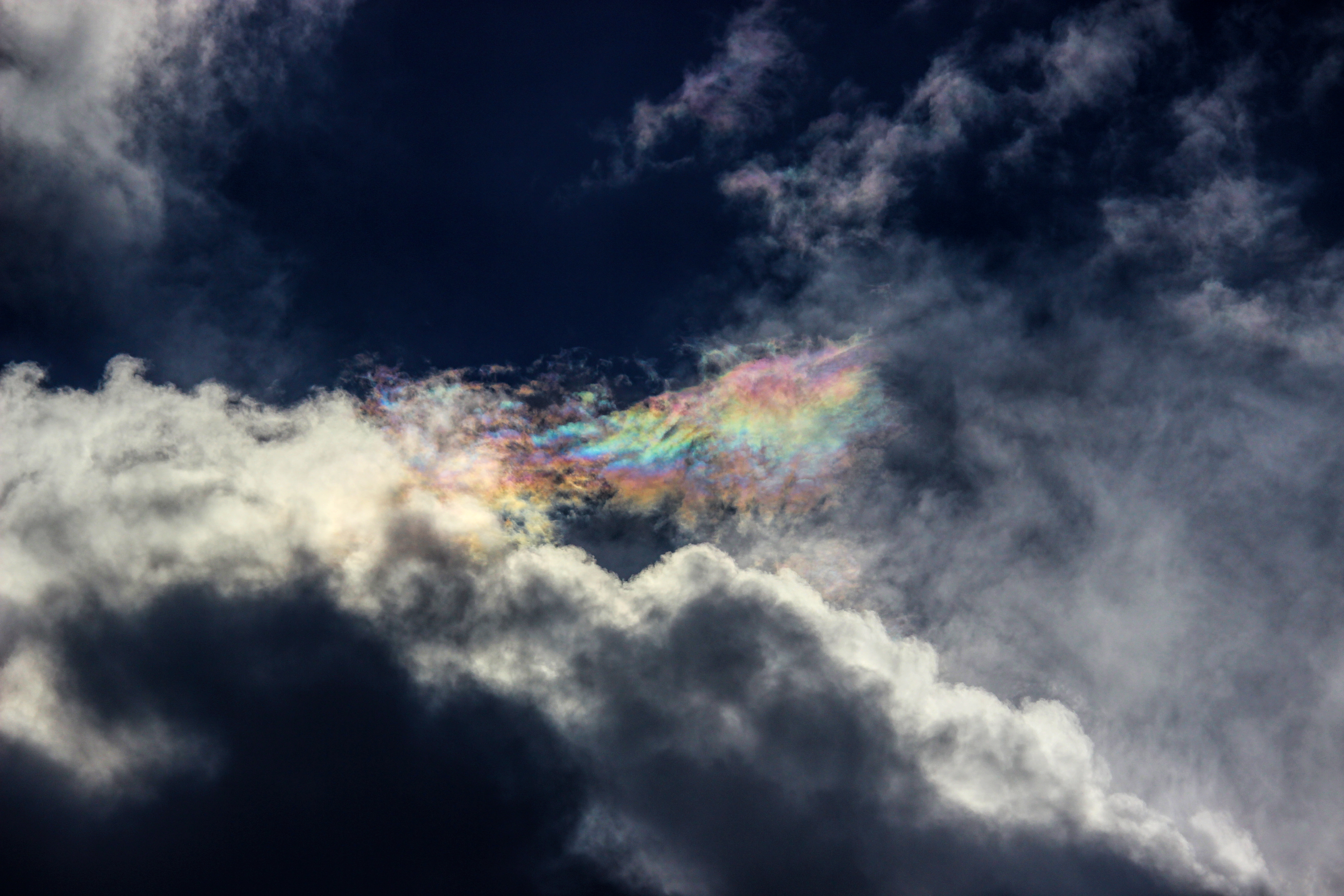
Cloud iridescence, seen above the clouds covered with grey clouds, Pondicherry, India

Cloud iridescence or irisation is a colourful optical phenomenon that occurs in a cloud and appears in the general proximity of the Sun or Moon. The colours resemble those seen in soap bubbles and oil on a water surface. It is a type of photometeor. This fairly common phenomenon is most often observed in altocumulus, cirrocumulus, lenticular, and cirrus clouds. They sometimes appear as bands parallel to the edge of the clouds. Iridescence is also seen in the much rarer polar stratospheric clouds, also called nacreous clouds.

The colours are usually pastel, but can be very vivid or mingled together, sometimes similar to mother-of-pearl. When appearing near the Sun, the effect can be difficult to spot as it is drowned in the Sun's glare. This may be overcome by shielding the sunlight with one's hand or hiding it behind a tree or building. Other aids are dark glasses, or observing the sky reflected in a convex mirror or in a pool of water.

== Etymology ==
Irisations are named after the Greek goddess Iris, goddess of rainbows and messenger of Zeus and Hera to the mortals below.

== Mechanism ==
Iridescent clouds are a diffraction phenomenon caused by small water droplets or small ice crystals individually scattering light. Larger ice crystals do not produce iridescence, but can cause halos, a different phenomenon instead caused by refraction.

Irisation is caused by very uniform water droplets diffracting light (within 10 degrees from the Sun) and by first order interference effects (beyond about 10 degrees from the Sun). It can extend up to 40 degrees from the Sun.

If parts of clouds contain small water droplets or ice crystals of similar size, their cumulative effect is seen as colours. The cloud must be optically thin, so that most rays encounter only a single droplet. Iridescence is therefore mostly seen at cloud edges or in semi-transparent clouds, while newly forming clouds produce the brightest and most colourful iridescence. When the particles in a thin cloud are very similar in size over a large extent, the iridescence takes on the structured form of a corona, a bright circular disk around the Sun or Moon surrounded by one or more coloured rings.

== Gallery ==
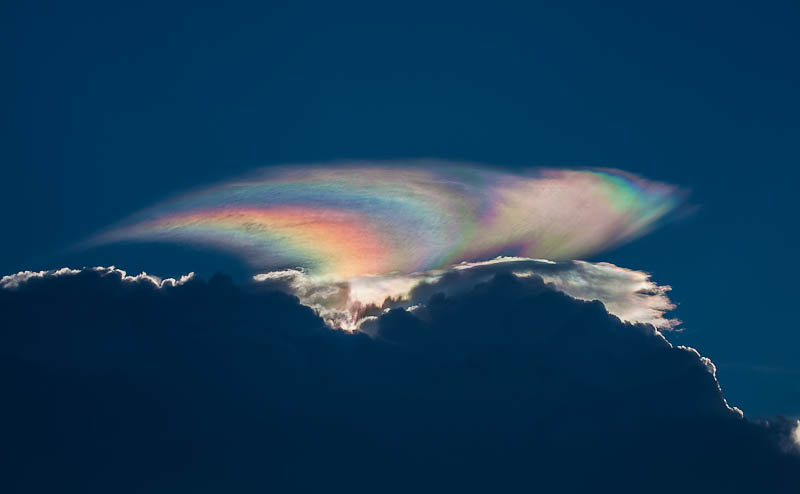
Florida, July 31, 2012

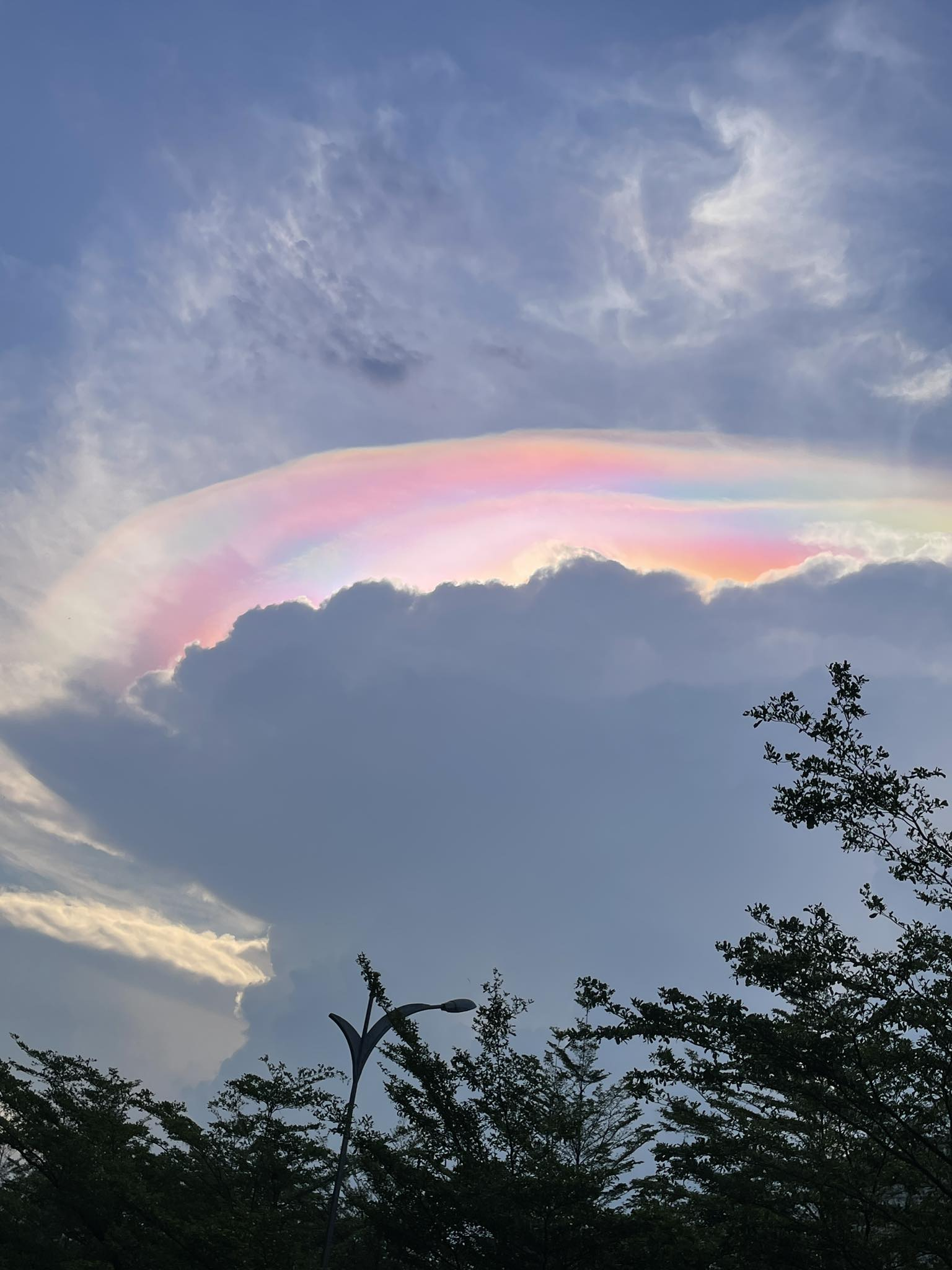
Ho Chi Minh City, Viet Nam. May 12th, 2024

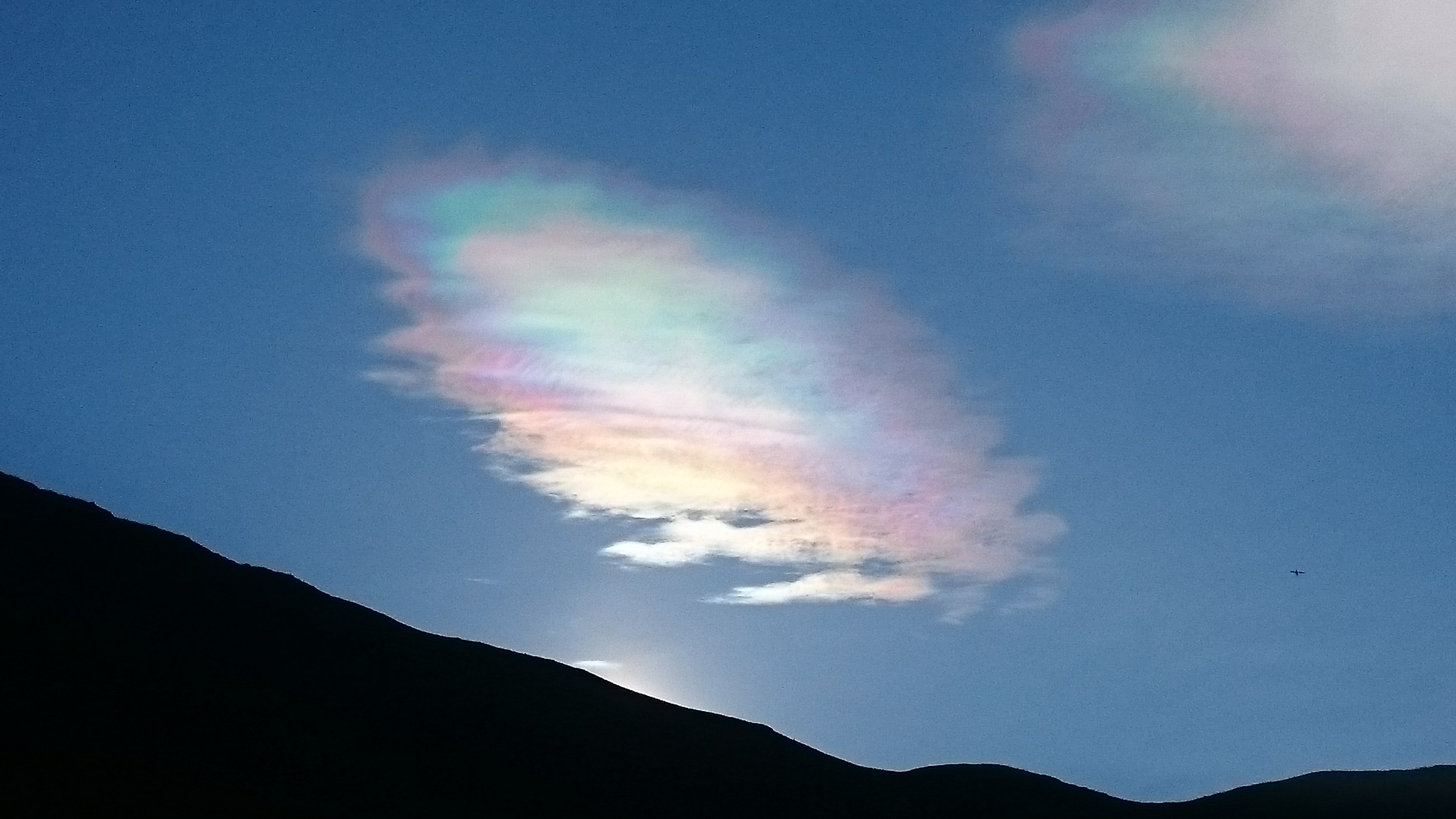

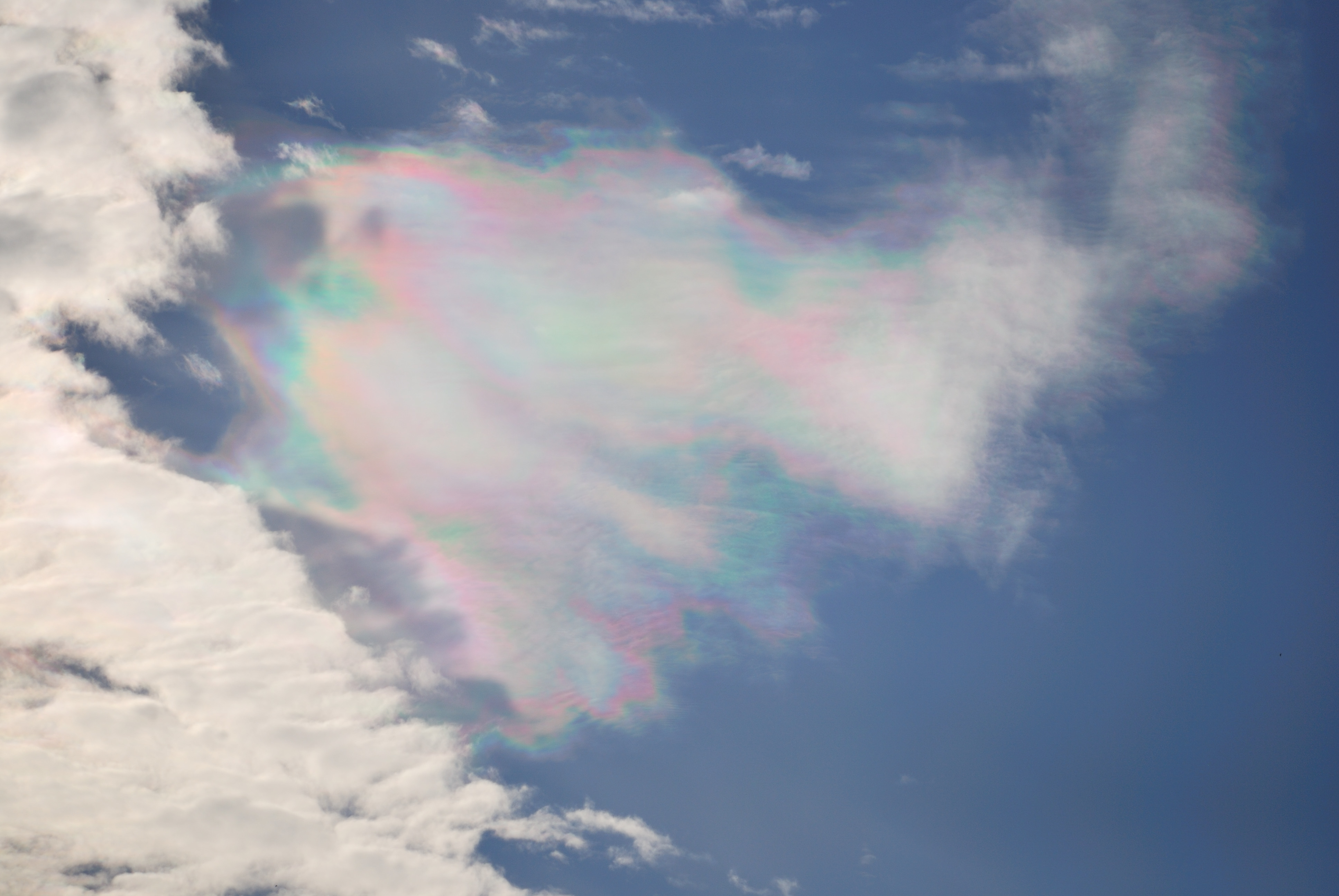

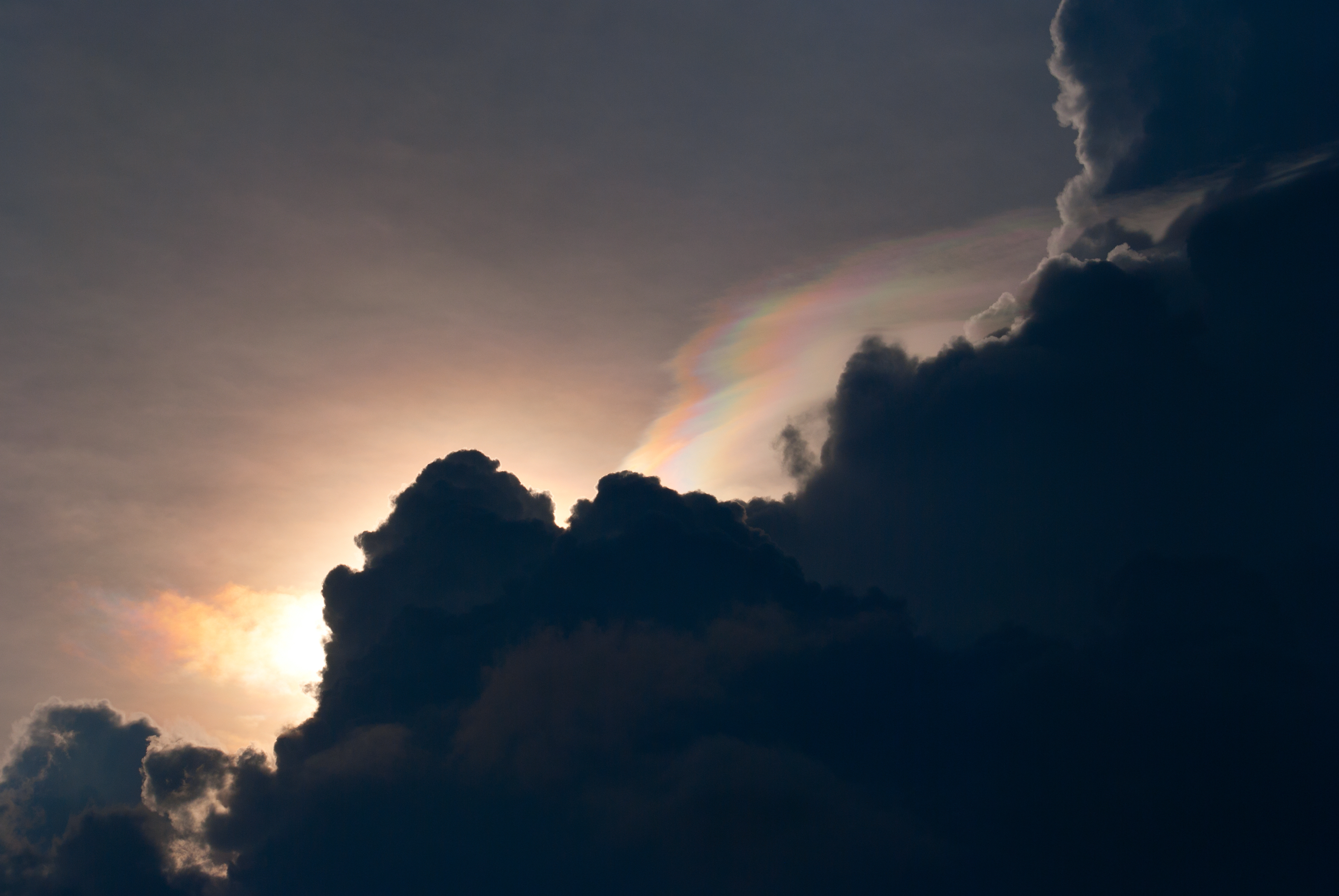

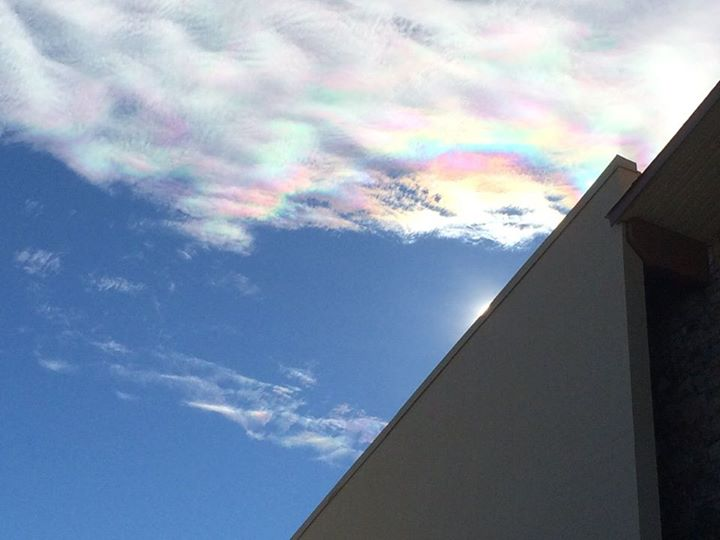

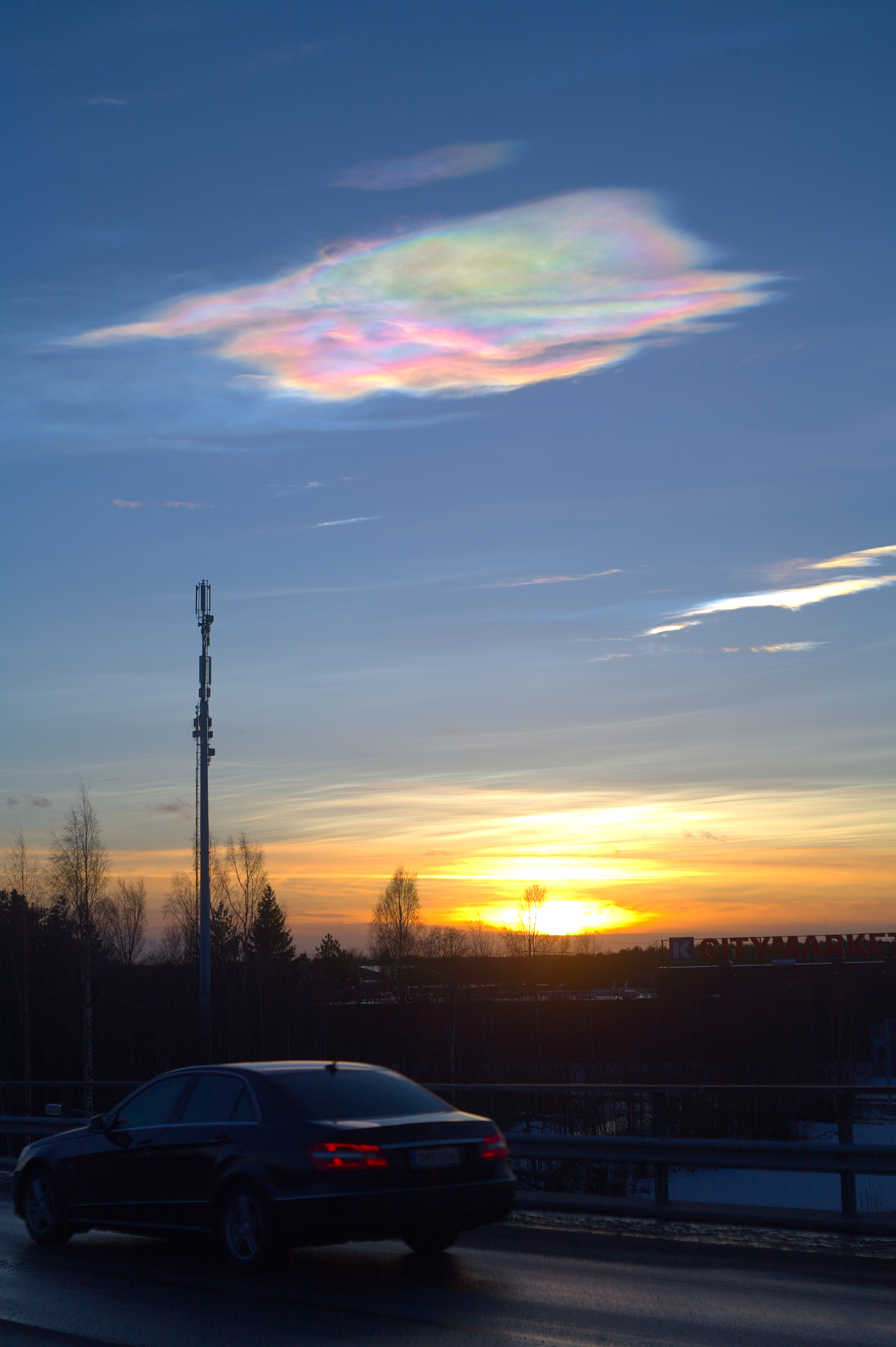

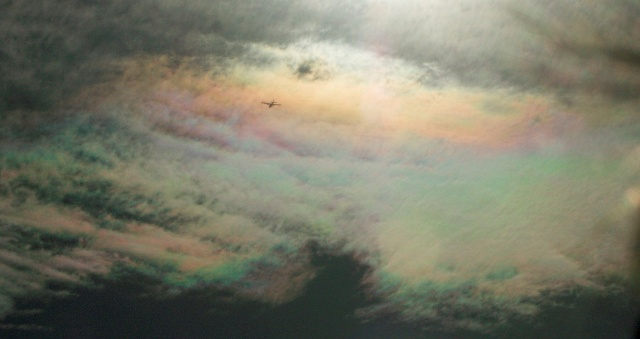
Irisation in clouds over Wellington, New Zealand

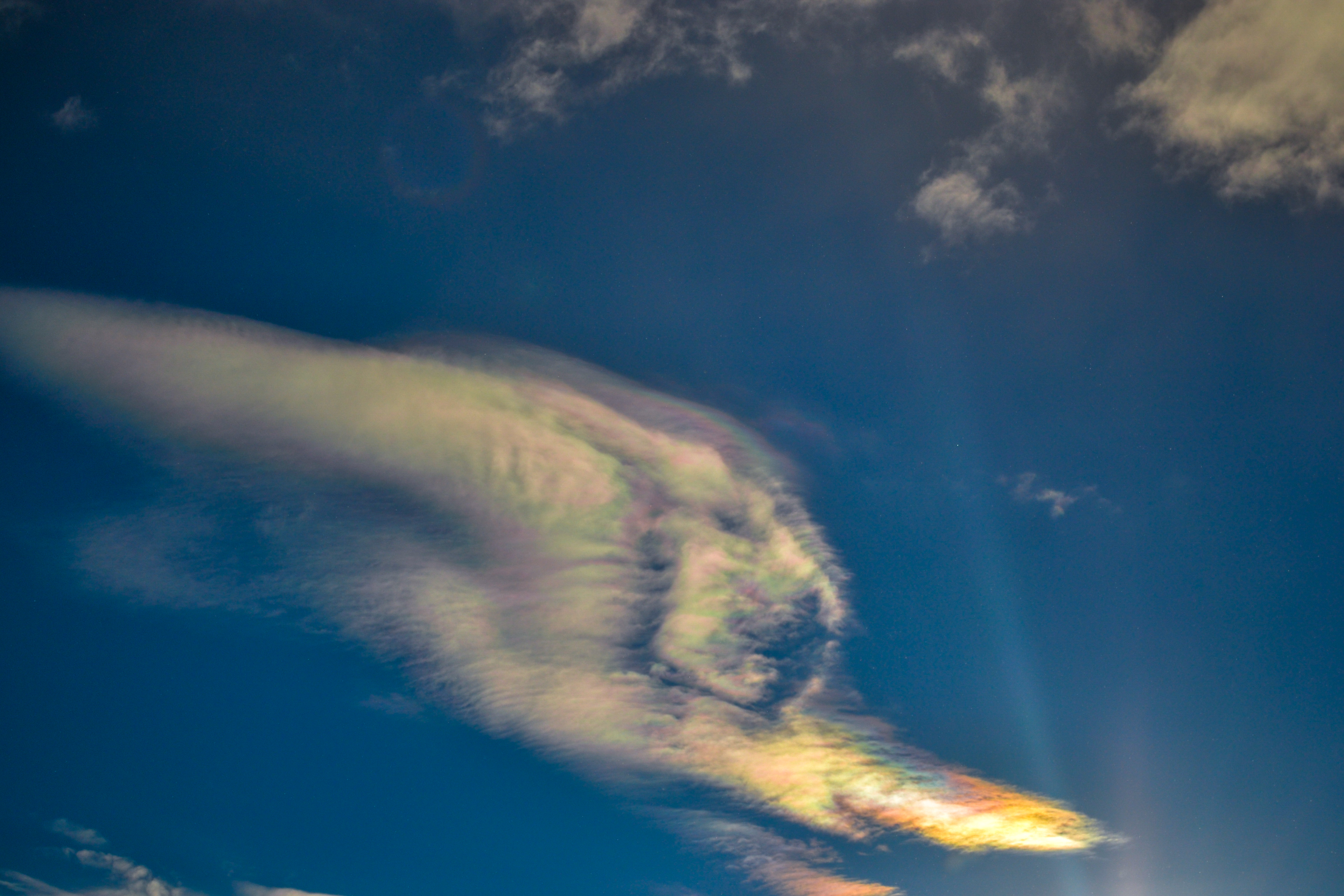
Vibrant cloud iridescence captured before sunset

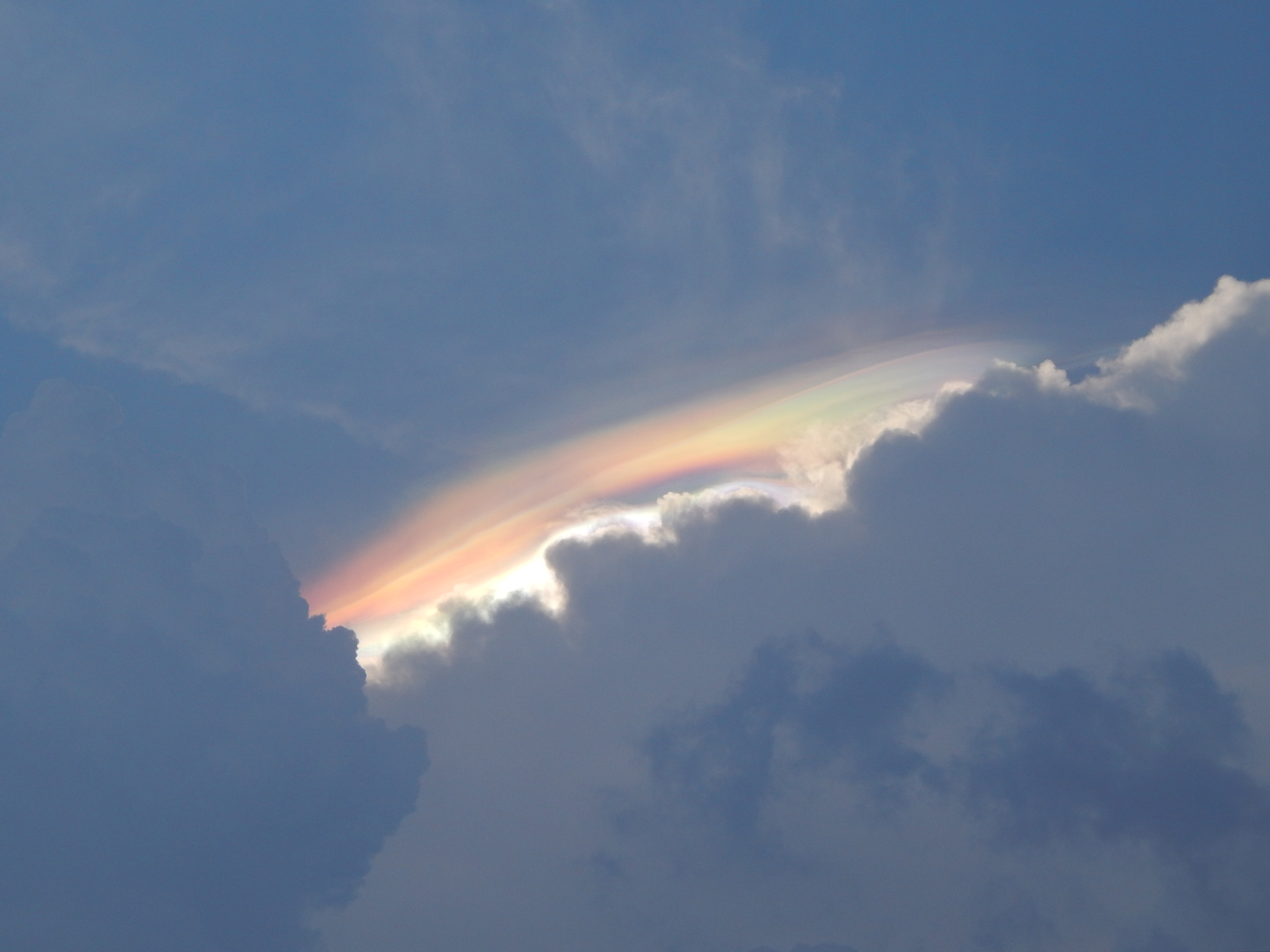

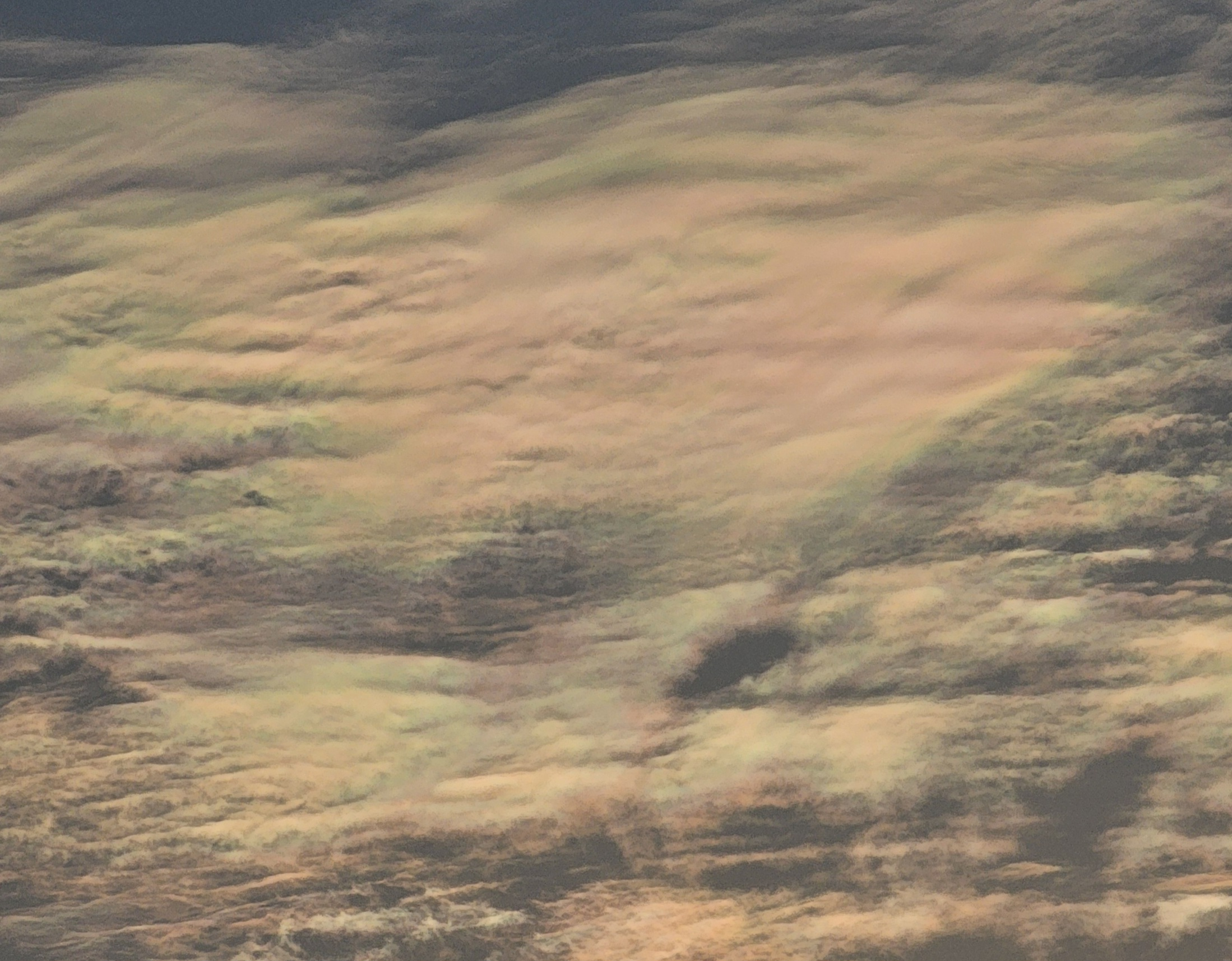
Iridescent Altostratus clouds seen in Cheongju City.

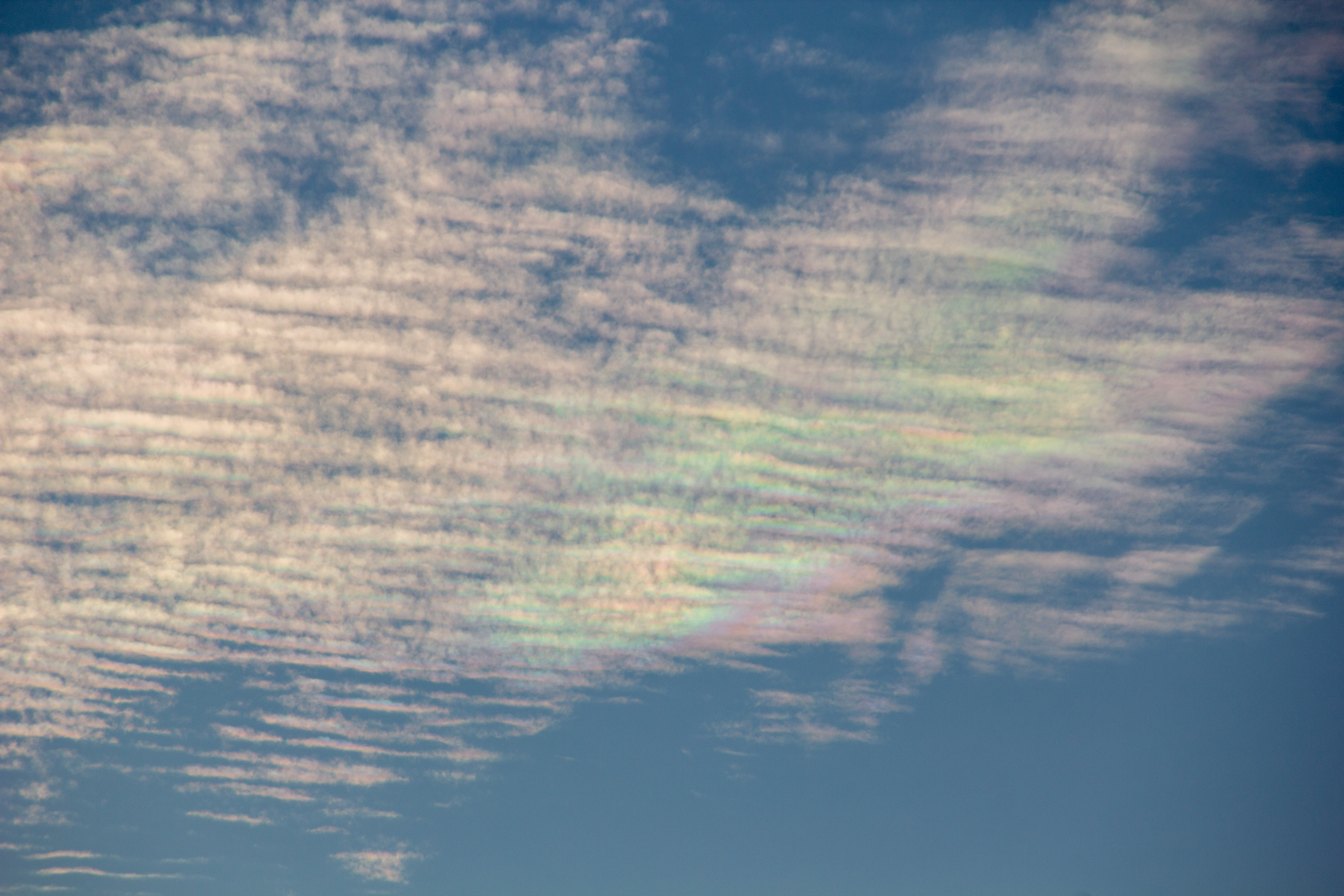
Iridescent clouds seen in Tenerife

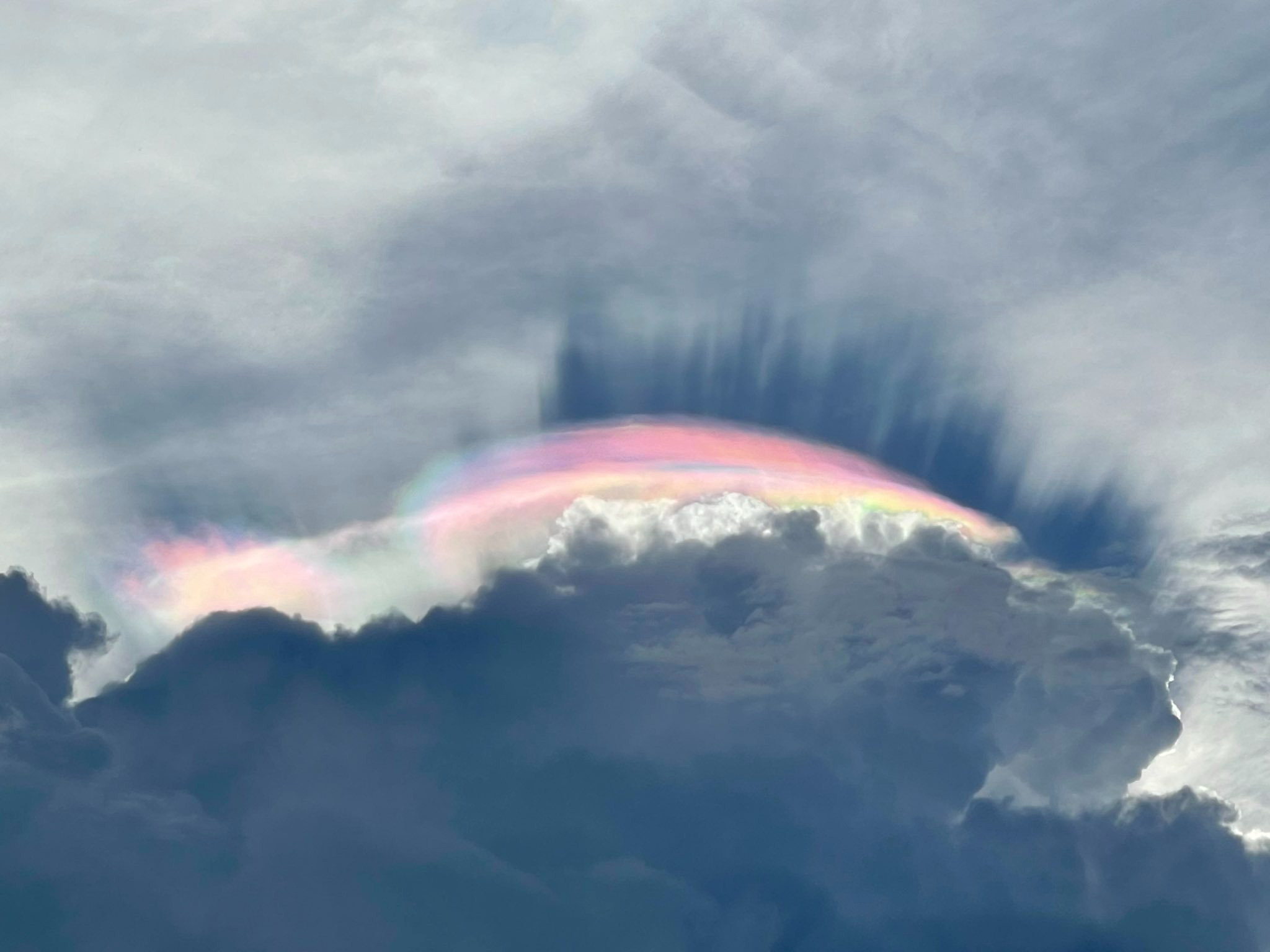
Parker Canyon, Arizona. Aug 6th, 2022

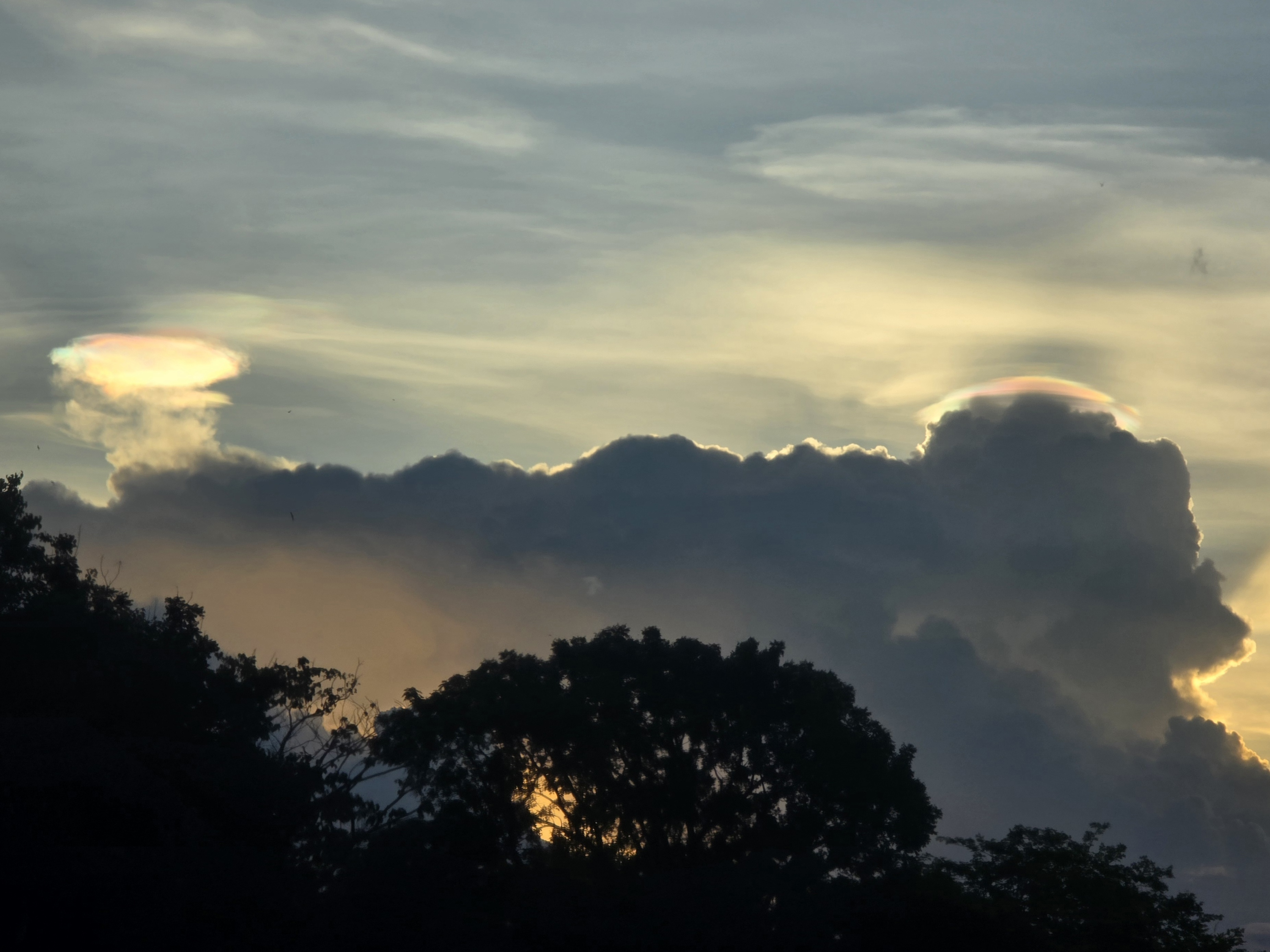
2 iridescent clouds above a cumulonimbus calvus cloud. Seen in Khon Kaen, Thailand, on June 13th, 2026

== See also ==
- Corona (optical phenomenon)
- Polar stratospheric cloud
- Circumhorizontal arc
- Noctilucent cloud
