= Asperitas (cloud) =

Supplementary cloud

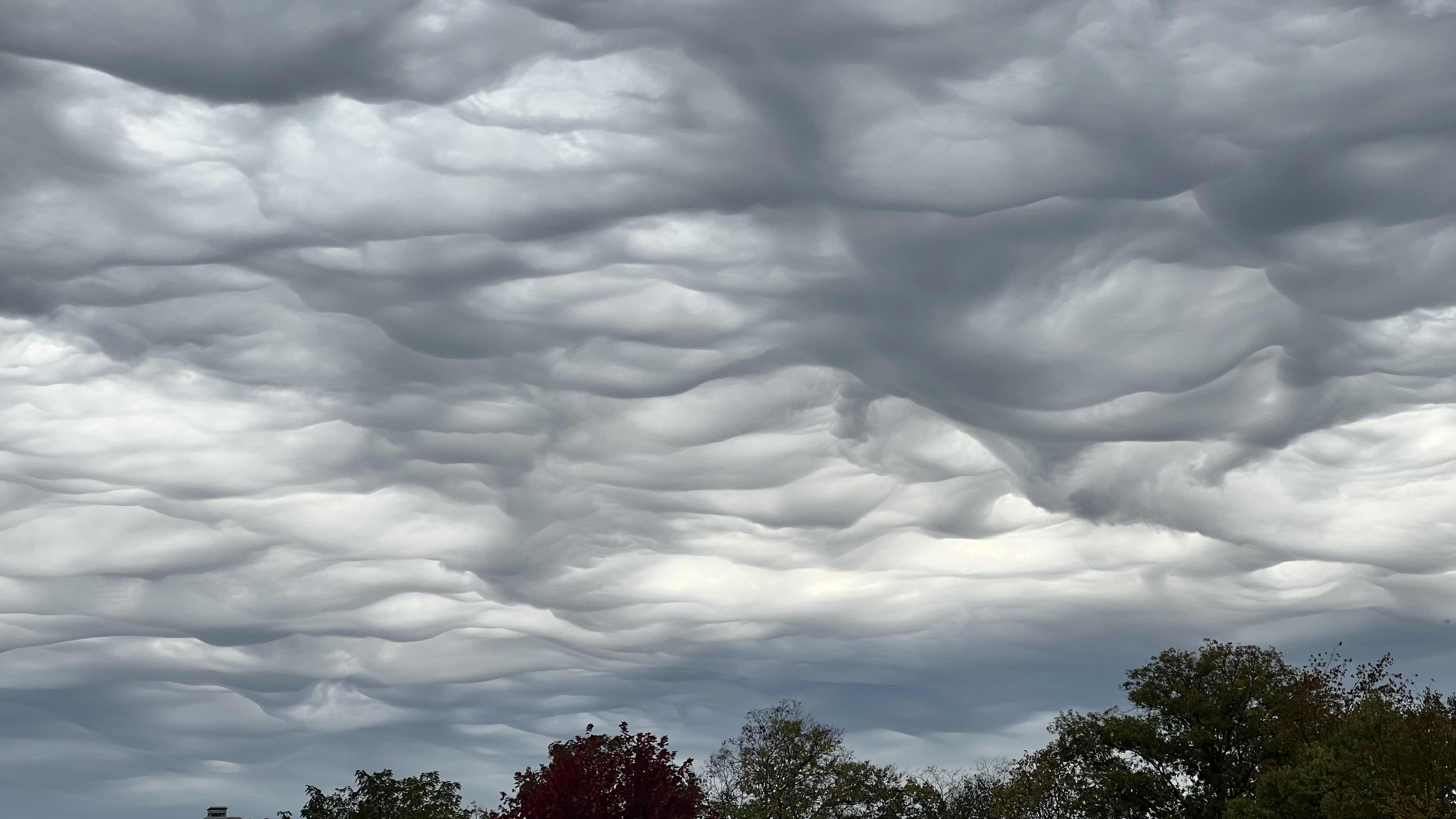
- Asperitas over Dayton, Ohio, on October 21, 2023
- Genus: Altocumulus or Stratocumulus depending on height, as Asperitas is thought to be a cumuliform structure
- Species: Stratiformis
- Variety: Opacus
- Altitude: Below 2,000 (or higher with altocumulus) m (Below 6,000 -or higher with altocumulus- ft)
- Appearance: Wavy undersurface
- Precipitation: No, but may form near storm clouds.

Asperitas (formerly known as Undulatus asperatus) is a cloud formation first popularized and proposed as a type of cloud in 2009 by Gavin Pretor-Pinney of the Cloud Appreciation Society. Added to the International Cloud Atlas as a supplementary feature in March 2017, it is the first cloud formation added since cirrus intortus in 1951. The name translates approximately as "roughness".

The clouds are closely related to undulatus clouds. Although they appear dark and storm-like, they almost always dissipate without a storm forming. The ominous-looking clouds have been widespread in the Plains states of the United States, often during the morning or midday hours following convective thunderstorm activity. They rarely occur outside that time.

== Definition ==
According to International Cloud Atlas, Asperitas are defined as

Well-defined, wave-like structures in the underside of the cloud; more chaotic and with less horizontal organization than the variety undulatus. Asperitas is characterized by localized waves in the cloud base, either smooth or dappled with smaller features, sometimes descending into sharp points as if viewing a roughened sea surface from below. Varying illumination levels and cloud thickness can lead to dramatic visual effects. Occurs mostly with Stratocumulus and Altocumulus.

== History ==
On June 20, 2006, Jane Wiggins took a picture of asperitas clouds from the window of a downtown office building in Cedar Rapids, Iowa, United States. Soon after taking it, Wiggins sent her Cedar Rapids image to the Cloud Appreciation Society, which displayed it on its image gallery. Since 2006, many similar cloud formations have been contributed to the gallery, and in 2009 Gavin Pretor-Pinney, founder of The Cloud Appreciation Society, began working with the Royal Meteorological Society to promote the cloud type as an entirely new type. Wiggins' photograph was posted on the National Geographic website on June 4, 2009.

In 2009, it was reported that Margaret LeMone, a cloud expert with the American National Center for Atmospheric Research, had taken photos of asperitas clouds for 30 years and considered it a new cloud type.

On July 23, 2013, Janet Salsman photographed them along the South Shore of Nova Scotia, Canada. On October 28, 2013, an asperitas cloud layer formed over Tuscaloosa, Alabama, United States. On July 7, 2014, asperitas clouds in Lincoln, Nebraska, United States, were filmed by Alex Schueth. One of the most dramatic formations was captured by Witta Priester in New Zealand in 2005. NASA posted the photo as the Astronomy Picture of the Day, which shows great detail, partly because sunlight illuminates the undulating clouds from the side.

The 2017 edition of the World Meteorological Organisation (WMO)'s International Cloud Atlas included asperitas as a supplementary feature. Pretor-Pinney gave an invited presentation at the WMO in Geneva for the launch of the revised Cloud Atlas on World Meteorological Day 2017. He has worked with scientists at the Department of Meteorology, University of Reading on possible mechanisms for the formation of asperitas, co-authoring a paper published in the Royal Meteorological Society's journal Weather.

== See also ==
- Gravity wave
- Undular bore
