= Caudus cloud =

Type of cumulus cloud

Cumulonimbus cauda
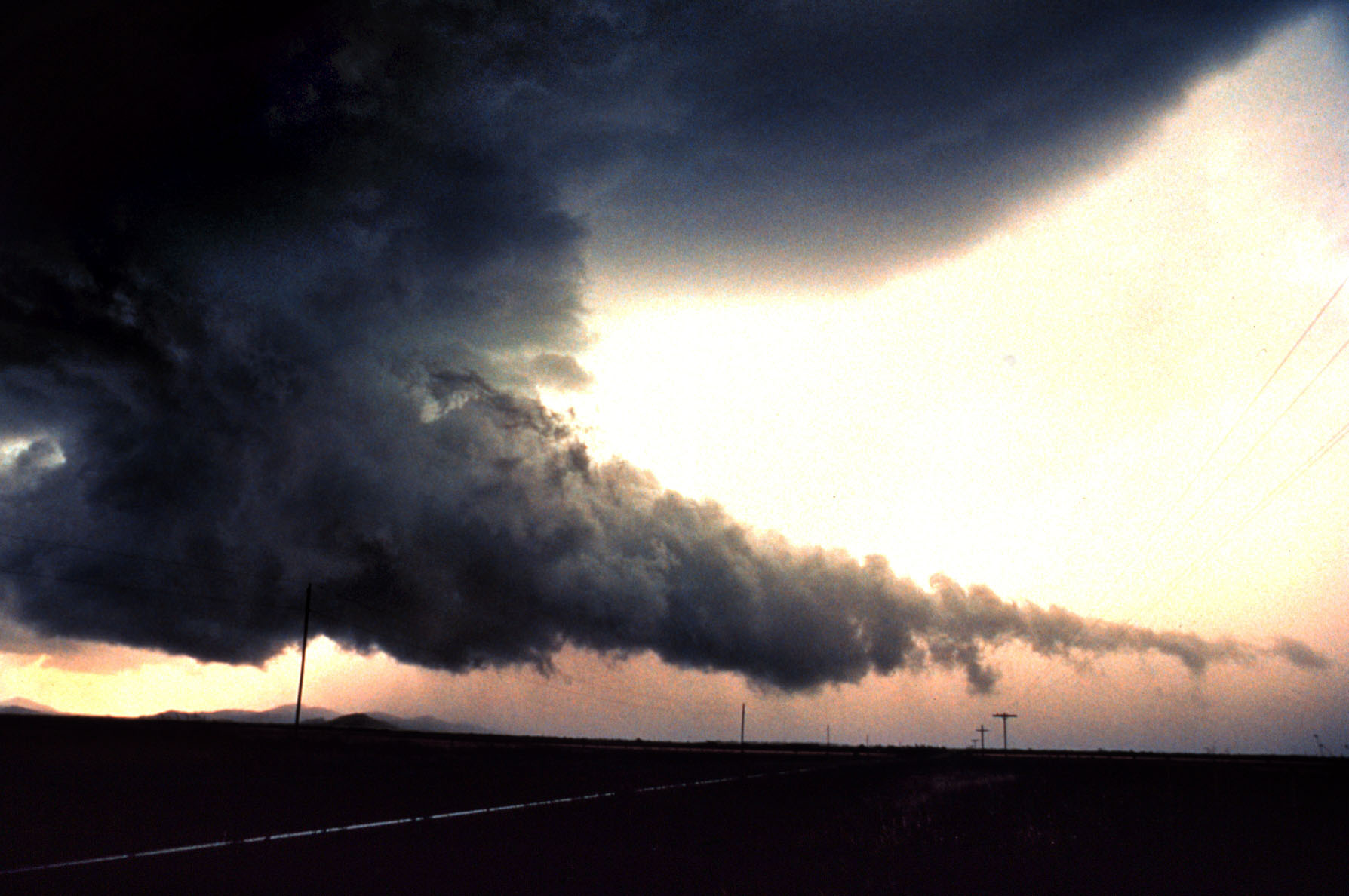
- Wall cloud with a tail cloud; cumulonimbus murus cauda
- Abbreviation: Cb cauda.
- Genus: Cumulonimbus (heap, rain) cauda (tail)
- Species: Calvus; Capillatus
- Variety: Murus
- Altitude: 500-16,000 m (2,000-52,000 ft)
- Classification: Family C (Low-level)
- Appearance: Horizontal cloud band that might be defined or might be cloud tags horizontally aligned in rows that give the wall cloud they are attached to the appearance of having a tail
- Precipitation: Uncommon, however; the murus cloud the cauda cloud feature is attached to does produce precipitation.

Cumulonimbus cauda is a type of cumulonimbus cloud, cauda is derived from Latin, meaning "tail", this cloud type may appear as a defined horizontal cloud band or as horizontally aligned cloud tags attached to the cumulonimbus murus cloud type, it is linked with an inflow of warm, moist air and that the thunderstorm the cloud has appeared in is strong, well organized and indicates that severe weather is possible within the area the storm is covering.
