= Photometeor =

Atmospheric optical phenomenon

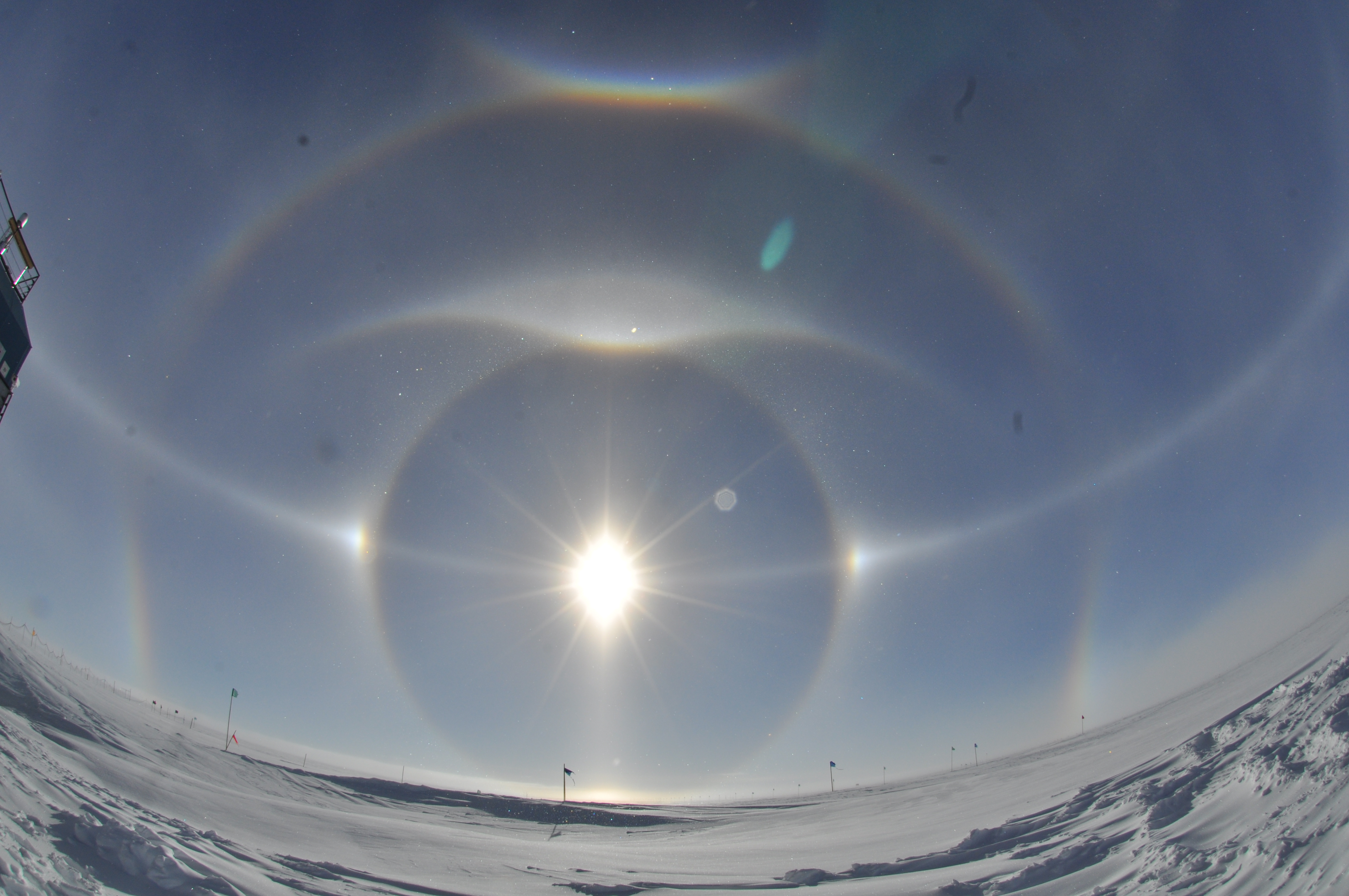
Various arcs, halos and sun dogs

In atmospheric optics, a photometeor is a bright object or other optical phenomenon appearing in the Earth's atmosphere when sunlight or moonlight creates a reflection, refraction, diffraction or interference under particular circumstances. The most common examples include halos, rainbows, fogbows, cloud iridescences (or irisation), glories, Bishop's rings, coronas, crepuscular rays, sun dogs, light pillars, mirages, scintillations, and green flashes.

Photometeors are not reported in routine weather observation.

== See also ==
- Hydrometeor
- Rayleigh scattering
