= Bishop's Ring =

Optical phenomenon

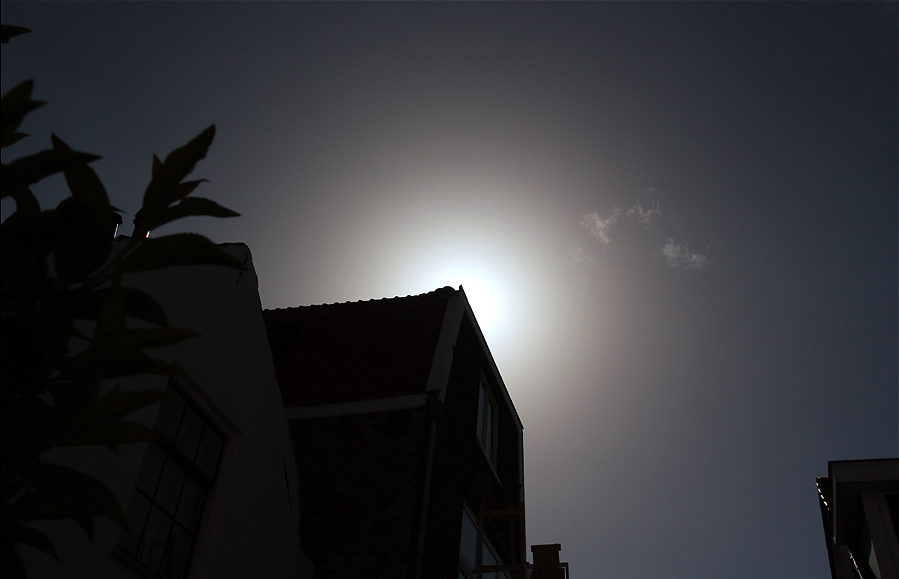
Bishop's Ring around the sun due to volcanic ash of the Eyjafjallajökull volcano on Iceland. Photographed from Leiden, the Netherlands, on 18 May 2010.

A Bishop's Ring is a diffuse brown or bluish halo observed around the sun. It is typically observed after large volcanic eruptions. The first recorded observation of a Bishop's Ring was by Rev. Sereno Edwards Bishop of Honolulu, after the Krakatoa eruption of August 27, 1883.

This gigantic explosion threw a vast quantity of dust and volatile gases into the atmosphere. Sulfate aerosols remained in the stratosphere, causing colorful sunrises and sunsets for several years. The first observation of this ring was published in 1883, being described as a “faint halo” around the sun. Bishop observed the phenomenon on September 5, 1883; the phenomenon was subsequently named after him, and was the subject of an 1886 professorial dissertation (Habilitationsschrift) by Albert Riggenbach.

Most observations agree that the inner rim of the ring is whitish or bluish white and that its outside is reddish, brownish or purple. The area enclosed by the ring is significantly brighter than its surroundings. From the sequence of colors with the red on the outside one can conclude that the phenomenon is caused by diffraction because halos always have their red part on their inside. On average, the radius of the ring is about 28°, but it can vary between 10° and 30°, depending on the dust size. The maximum of 30° is a rather big radius which can only be caused by very small dust particles (0.002 mm) which all have to be of about the same size.

Sulfur compound aerosols derived from volcanic eruptions have been found to be the source for the Bishop's Ring effect. A Bishop's Ring was observed for a long period of time in Japan after the eruption of Mt. Pinatubo.
