= Ralph Abercromby (meteorologist) =

Scottish meteorologist

Ralph Abercromby (11 February 1842 – 21 June 1897) was a Scottish meteorologist.

Abercromby was born in Leamington, Warwickshire, the youngest son of the third Lord Abercromby. His mother, Louisa Penuel Forbes, was a daughter of Lord Medwyn.

His obituary in Nature summarises his ancestry, "Several of his immediate relatives had been eminently distinguished. His great-grandfather, Sir Ralph Abercromby, who died in 1801, in the moment of victory, at the Battle of Alexandria, had served his country with brilliant distinction, in the West Indies (Trinidad) and at the Helder." He himself served in the British Army from 1860 to 1869 and was stationed in Quebec.

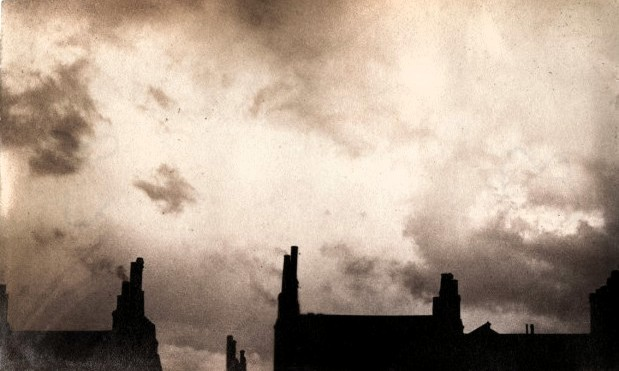
Raggy, Inky Cloud in London. Photo by Ralph Abercromby. 1884

Ralph Abercromby is noted for his contributions to meteorology, his travels producing reports in Seas and skies in many latitudes such as weather and telegraphy at the US signals office. He wrote on the nomenclature of cloud formation, and figured prominently in the history of the classification system developed by Luke Howard; along with Hugo Hildebrand Hildebrandsson (1838-1920) he developed the system laid out by Howard.

He attained the rank of lieutenant in the 60th Rifles. Abercromby died unmarried in 1897 in Sydney, Australia.

== Works ==
- 1887 Weather: A Popular Exposition of the Nature of Weather Changes From Day To Day (1888), Kessinger Publishing, ISBN 0-548-82646-3
- Cloud Land in Folklore And Science (Folklore History Series), Pierides Press, ISBN 1-4455-2335-3
- Principles of Forecasting By Means of Weather Charts, Pierides Press, ISBN 1-146-39376-8
- Seas And Skies in Many Latitudes: Or, Wanderings in Search of Weather, London: Edward Stanford, 1888; Nabu Press edition, 2012, ISBN 1-144-14870-7

His essay on the climate of Australia was reissued as "Ralph Abercromby, H. A. B. 1865 Hunt, Henry Chamberlaine Russell, Three Essays on Australian Weather, Nabu Press, ISBN 1-177-54608-6"
