= Hugo Hildebrand Hildebrandsson =

Swedish meteorologist

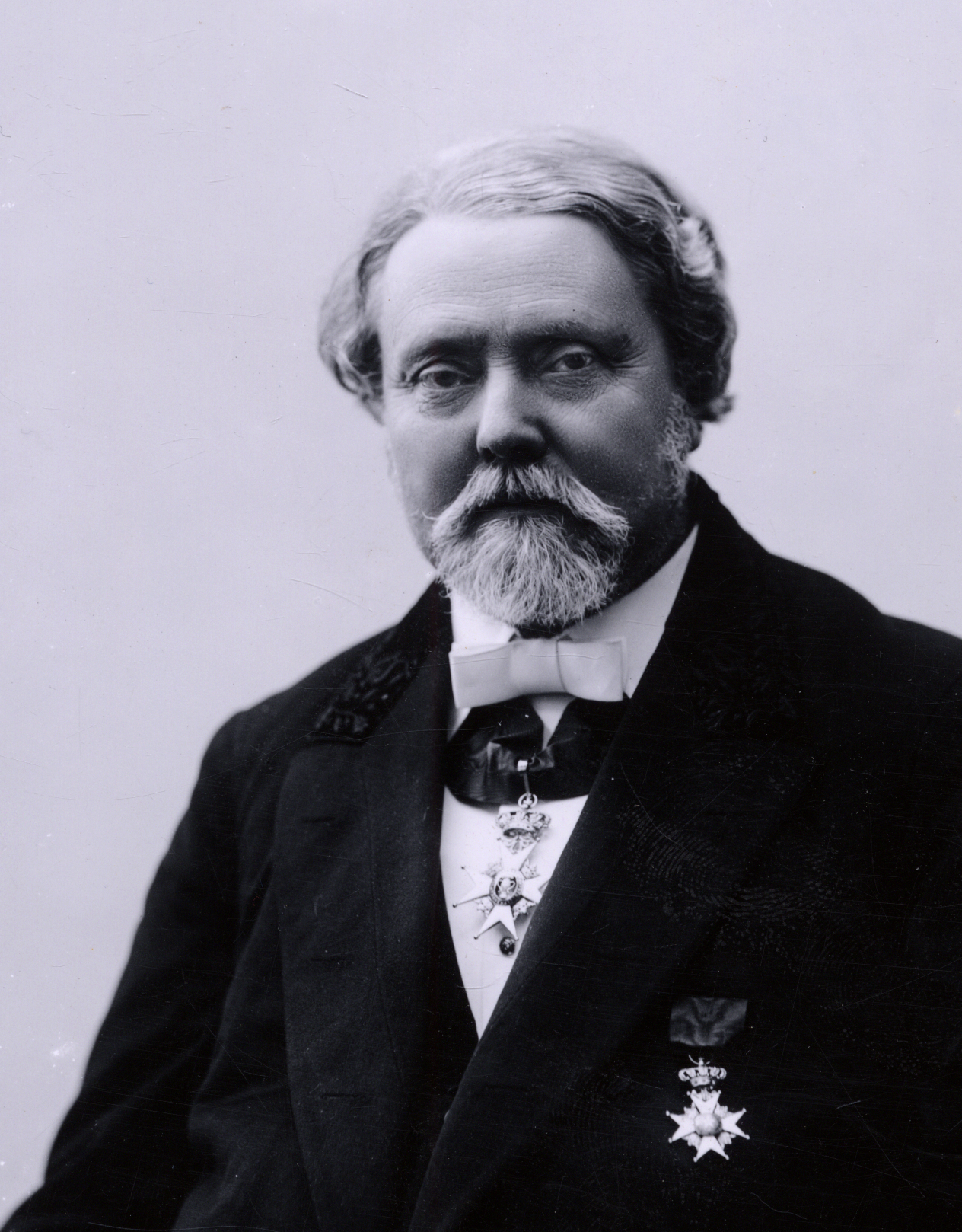
- Born: 19 August 1838; Stockholm, Sweden
- Died: 29 July 1925 (aged 86)
- Awards: Symons Gold Medal

Academic background
- Education: Uppsala University

Academic work
- Discipline: meteorology
- Institutions: Uppsala University
- Main interests: clouds
- Notable works: International Cloud Atlas

Hugo Hildebrand Hildebrandsson (19 August 1838 – 29 July 1925) was a Swedish meteorologist and professor at Uppsala University between 1878 and 1907.

== Early life and education ==
Cloud atlas by H.H. Hildebrandsson, W. Köppen, G. von Neumayer, 1890.

Hildebrandsson was born in Stockholm, and educated at the Stockholm gymnasium and the university of Upsala, where he took his doctor's degree in 1858, becoming doctor of physics in 1866.

== Scientific career ==
In 1878, Hildebrandsson was appointed first professor of meteorology at Upsala and director of the meteorological observatory there. He retained these posts until 1906. He was a prominent member of the International Meteorological Committee, and for some years served as its secretary.

=== Research specialty ===
As a meteorologist, Hildebrandsson is notable for his researches into the subject of clouds. He denominated a new sort of cloud—Cumulus Cloud. In 1880, he was requested by the International Meteorological Committee to prepare the International Cloud Atlas, a work carried out in conjunction with Leon Teisserenc de Bort. Many further observations were subsequently incorporated in Les bases de la météorologie dynamique (1907), in which Teisserenc de Bort again collaborated. His papers on centers of action of the atmosphere marked a great advance in seasonal forecasts.

In 1897, Hildebrandsson was the first to scientifically postulate the connection between Asian weather anomalies and the tropical Pacific El Nino. (NOAA, 2011)

== Honors and awards ==
In 1880, Hildebrandsson was elected an honorary fellow of the Royal Meteorological Society of London, which in 1920 awarded him the Symons Gold Medal. He was also a member of many other foreign scientific societies.

In 1888, he was elected a member of the Royal Swedish Academy of Sciences, and he was also a member of the Nobel Committee for Physics.

== Photos from On the classification of clouds used at the Upsala meteorological observatory, 1879 ==
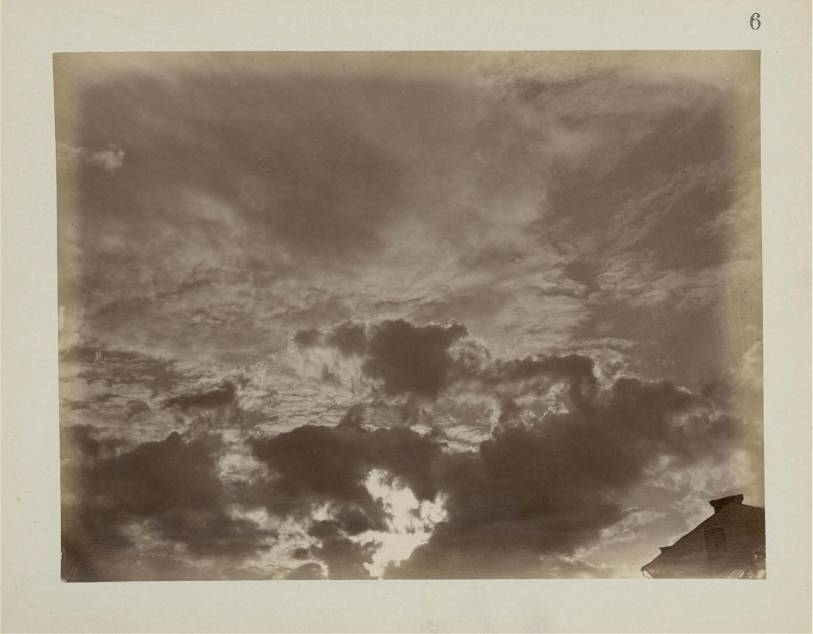

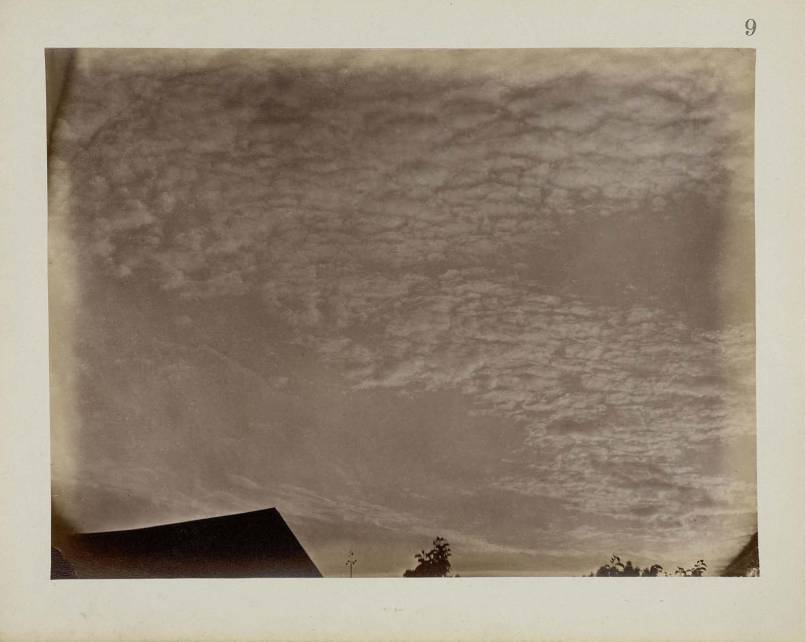

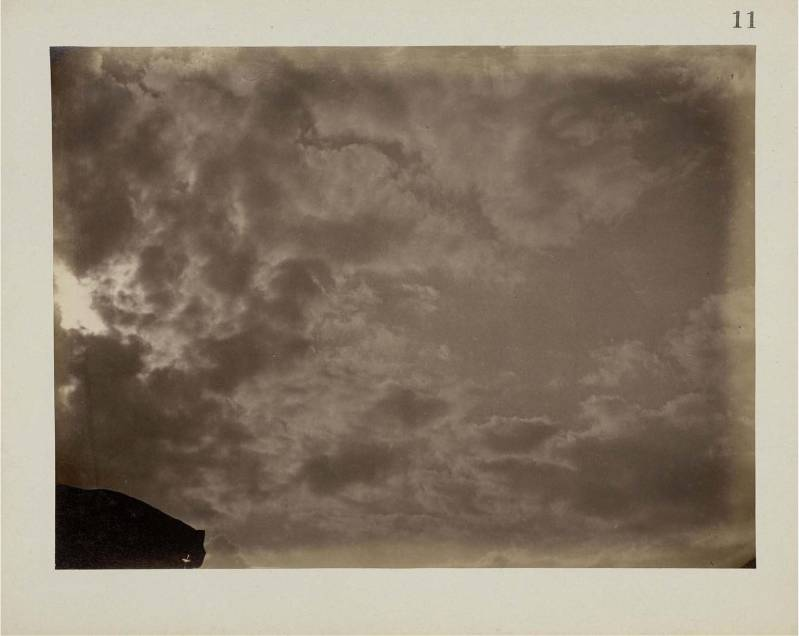

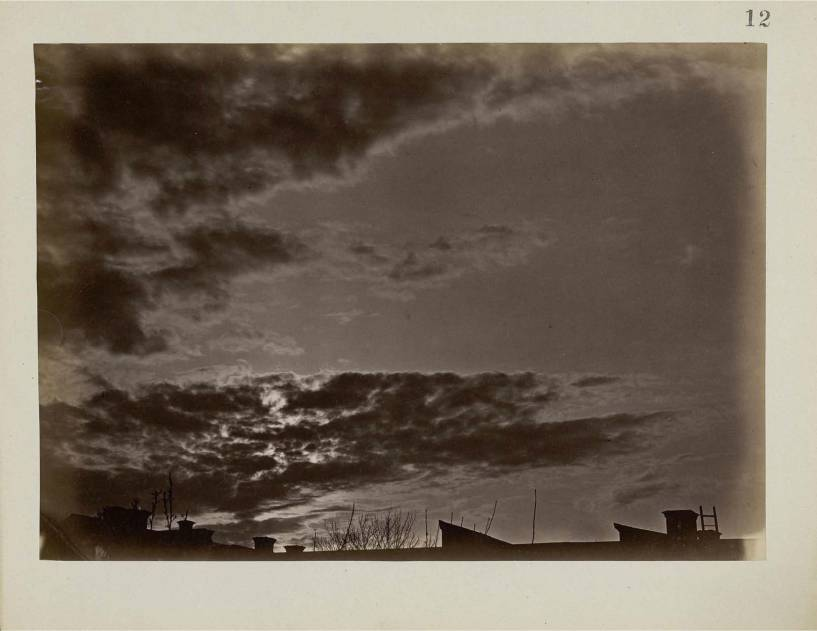

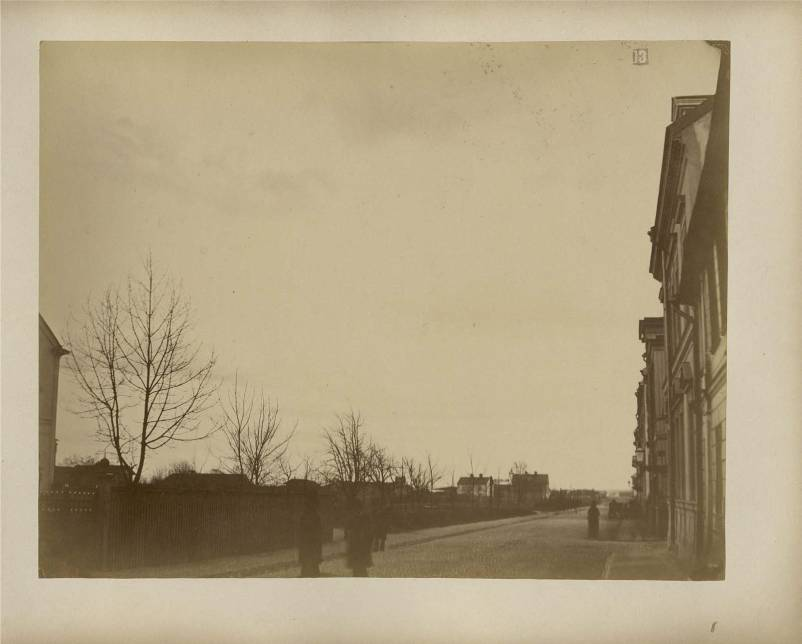

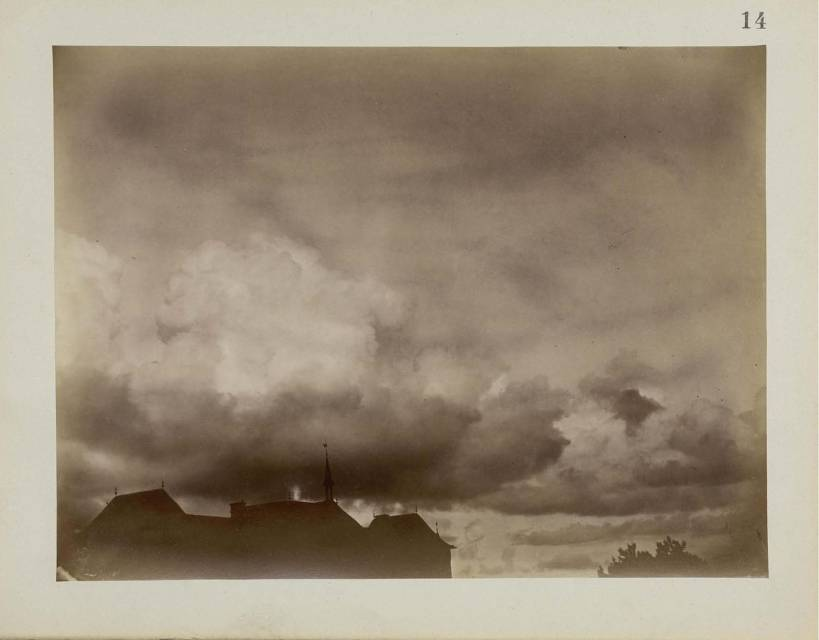

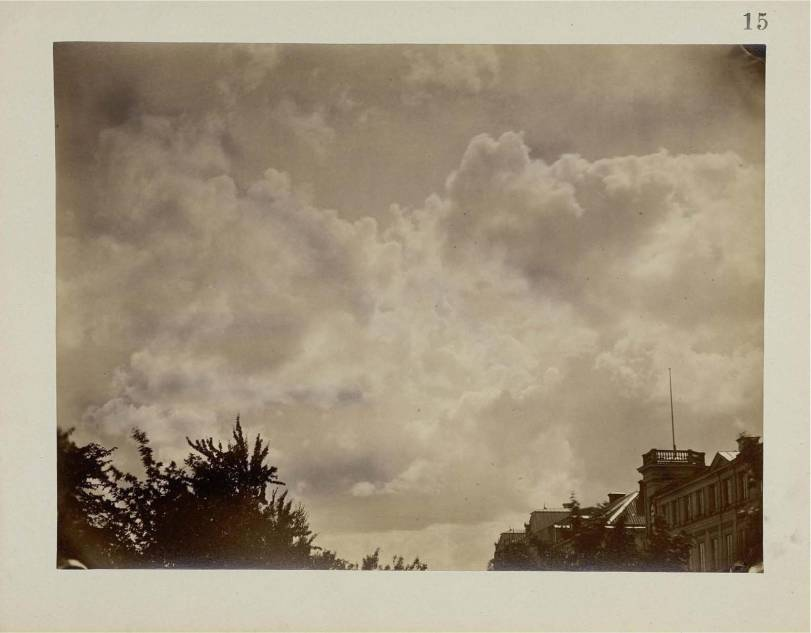

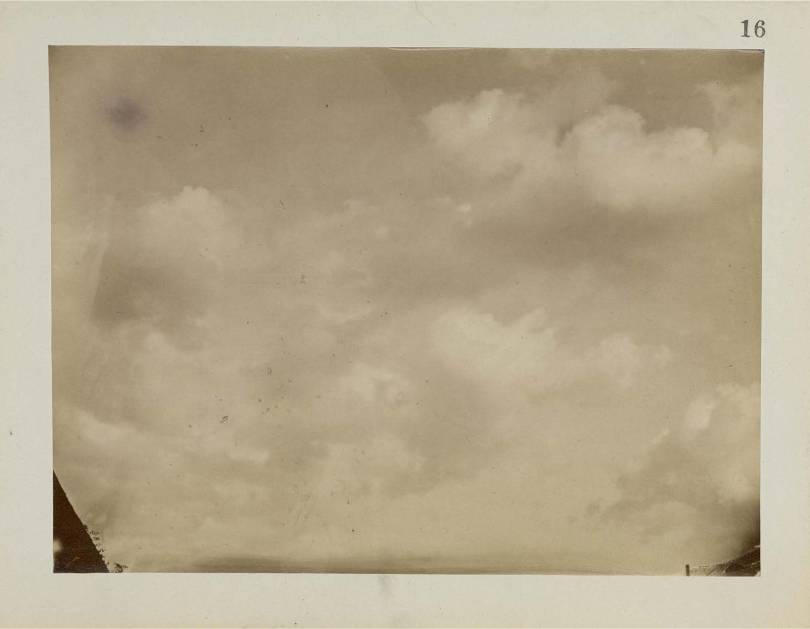
