= Wladimir Köppen =

Russian–German meteorologist (1846–1940)

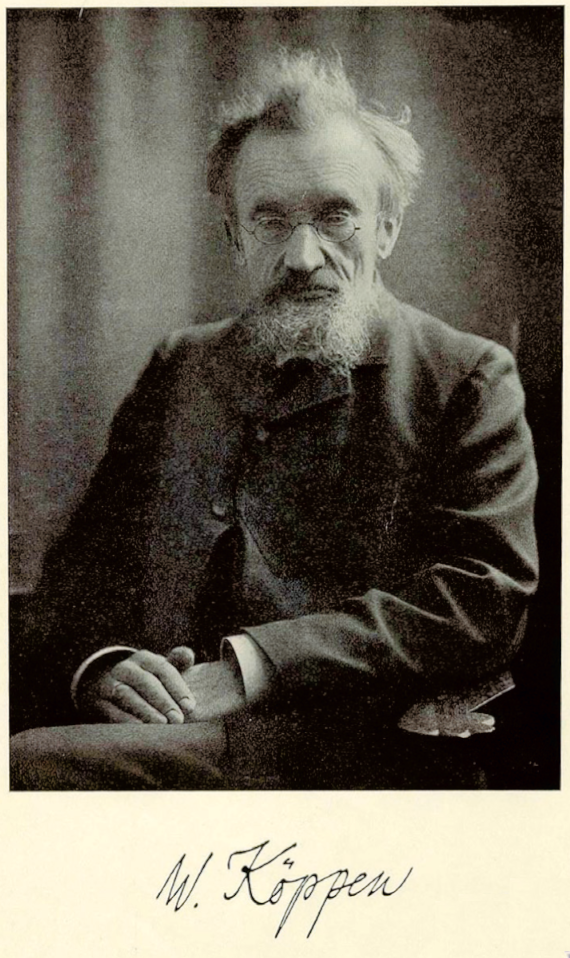
- Born: Wladimir Petrovich Köppen; 25 September 1846; Saint Petersburg, Russian Empire
- Died: 22 June 1940 (aged 93); Graz, Ostmark, Nazi Germany (now in Austria)
- Education: University of Saint Petersburg
- Known for: Köppen climate classification
- Relatives: Alfred Wegener (son-in-law)
- Scientific career
- Fields: Geography, meteorology, climatology, botany
- Workplaces: University of Heidelberg; University of Leipzig

Wladimir Petrovich Köppen (/ˈkɜːpən/ KUH-pən; German: [ˈkœpn̩]; Russian: Влади́мир Петро́вич Кёппен, romanized: Vladímir Petróvich Kyoppen, (Note: In old orthography, his name is written Влади́міръ Петро́вичъ Ке́ппенъ, while his surname is pronounced [ˈkʲep(ː)ʲɪn].) IPA: [vlɐˈdʲimʲɪr pʲɪˈtrovʲɪtɕ ˈkʲɵp(ː)ʲɪn]; 25 September 1846 – 22 June 1940) was a Russian–German geographer, meteorologist, climatologist and botanist. After studies in St. Petersburg, he spent the bulk of his life and professional career in Germany and Austria. The Köppen climate classification system, named after a proposal he first made in 1884, with some modifications, is still widely used. Köppen made significant contributions to several branches of science, and coined the name aerology for the science of the upper atmosphere.

== Background and education ==
Wladimir Köppen was born in St. Petersburg, Russia. He lived there until he was 20 years old. Köppen's grandfather, Johann Friedrich von Köppen, was one of several German doctors invited to Russia by Empress Catherine II to improve sanitation and was later personal physician to the tsar. Johann's son (Wladimir's father), Peter von Köppen (Pyotr Ivanovich Köppen in Russian) (1793–1864), was a noted geographer, historian and ethnographer of ancient Russian cultures and an important contributor to intellectual exchanges between western European slavists and Russian scientists. Wladimir attended secondary school in Simferopol, Crimea, and began his studies of botany in 1864 at the University of St. Petersburg.

He frequently traveled to his family's estate on the Crimean coast from St. Petersburg and to and from Simferopol, in the interior of the peninsula. The floral and geographical diversity of the Crimean peninsula, as well as the starker geographical transitions between the capital and his home, did much to awaken an interest in the relationship between climate and the natural world.

In 1867, he transferred to the University of Heidelberg. In 1870, he defended his doctorate dissertation on the effects of temperature on plant growth at the University of Leipzig. He served in the Prussian ambulance corps in the Franco-Prussian War and later worked at the Central Physical Observatory in St. Petersburg.

He identified five major climatic groups, which correspond with the five main vegetation groups:

- Tropical rainy climate
- Dry climate
- Warm temperature rainy climate
- Snowy and cold climate
- Polar climate

== Career and contributions ==
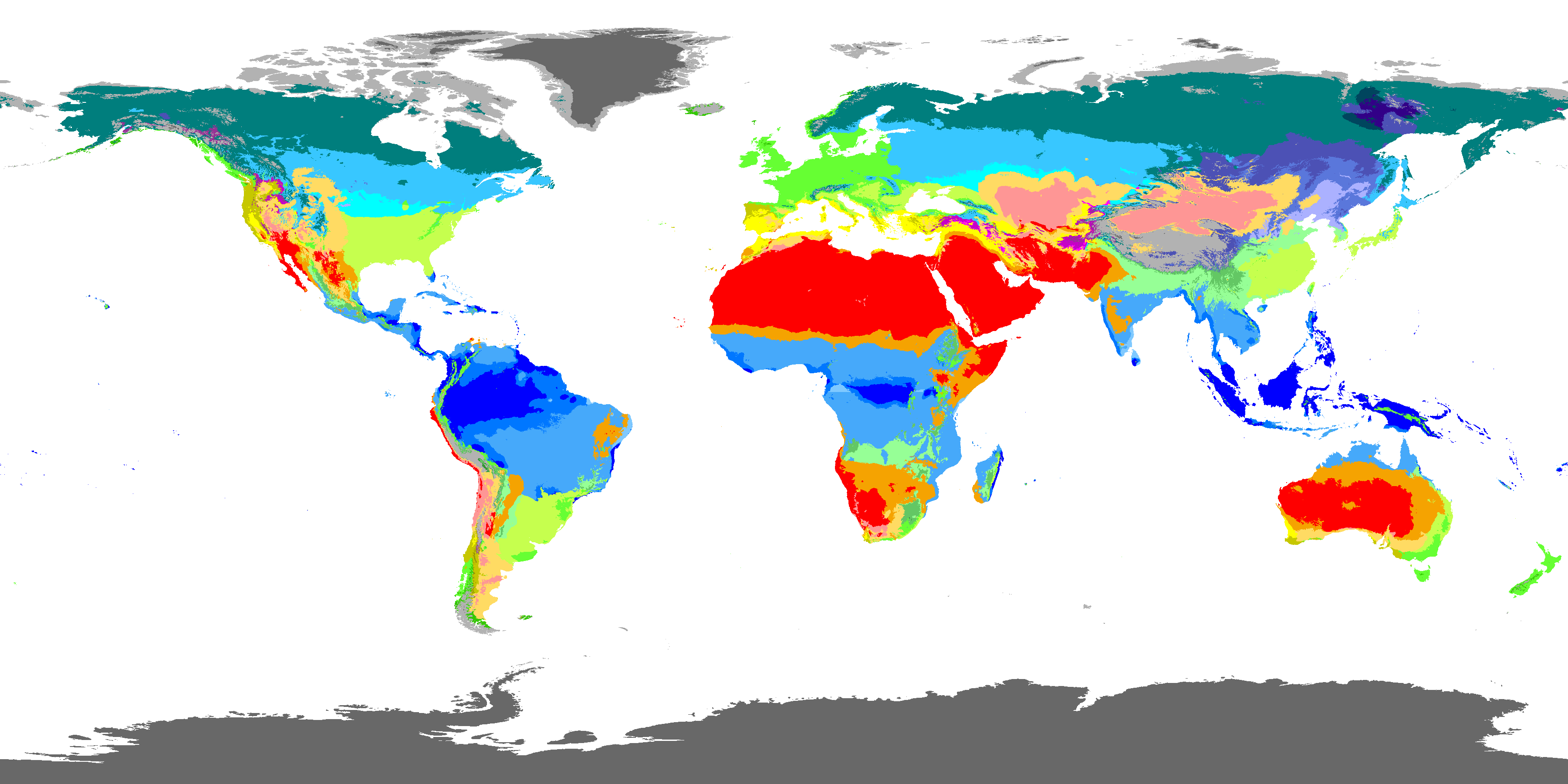
Köppen's global climate classification map

Köppen was a principal founder of modern climatology and meteorology. Between 1850 and 1860, Köppen contributed to Seewart's sailing handbooks for the Atlantic, Pacific and Indian Oceans by studying ship reports over the winds of different oceans. Between 1872 and 1873 Köppen was employed in the Russian meteorological service as an assistant where he helped prepare the daily synoptic weather map.

In 1875, he moved back to Germany and became the chief of the new Division of Marine Meteorology at the German Maritime Observatory (Deutsche Seewarte) based in Hamburg. There, he was responsible for establishing a weather forecasting service for the northwestern part of Germany and the adjacent sea areas. After four years of service, he was able to move on to his primary interest of fundamental research, and left the meteorological office. In 1937, he was personally honored by German Chancellor Adolf Hitler with the Adlerschild des Deutschen Reiches.

Köppen began a systematic study of the climate and experimented with balloons to obtain data from upper layers of the atmosphere. In 1884, he published the first version of his map of climatic zones in which the seasonal temperature ranges were plotted. It led to the development of the Köppen climate classification system around 1900, which he kept improving for the rest of his life. The full version of his system appeared first in 1918; after several modifications, the final version was published in 1936.

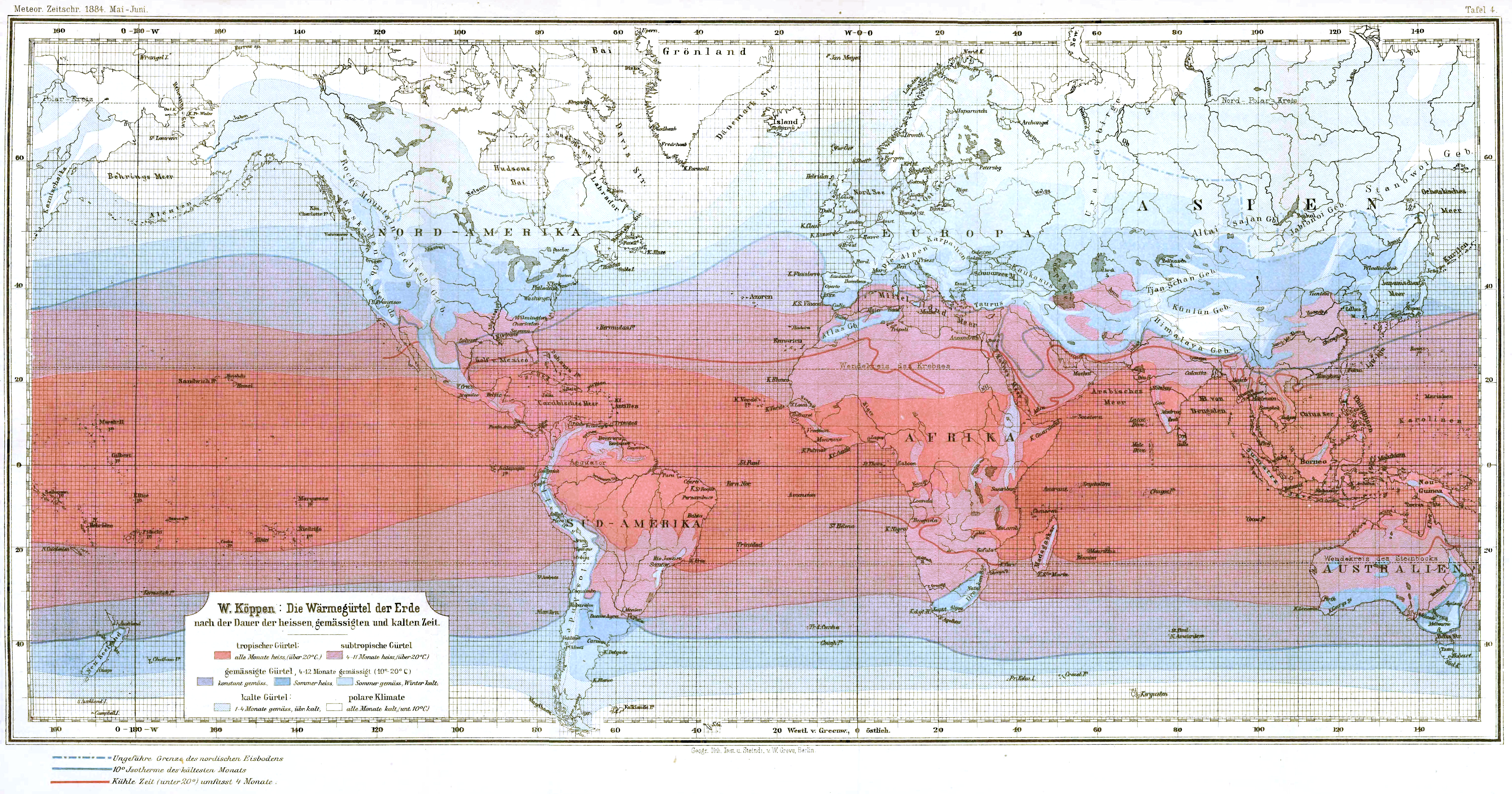
Köppen's 1884 map

Apart from the description of climate types, he was acquainted with paleoclimatology. In 1924, he and his son-in-law Alfred Wegener published a paper called Die Klimate der Geologischen Vorzeit (The climates of the geological past) providing crucial support to the Milanković theory on ice ages. In 1911, he co-wrote The Thermodynamics of the Atmosphere, a textbook that became very popular.

Towards the end of his life, Köppen cooperated with the German climatologist Rudolf Geiger to produce a five-volume work, Handbuch der Klimatologie (Handbook of Climatology). It was never completed, but several parts, three of them by Köppen, were published. After Köppen's death in 1940, Geiger continued to work on modifications to the climate classification system.

Köppen was a prolific scientist, producing more than 500 papers, and he retained his intellectual curiosity and wide range of interests throughout his life. In 1890, he co-authored the first cloud atlas. Alongside scientific pursuits, he was actively involved in social questions, devoting much time and energy to such problems of land-use and school reform and nutrition for the underprivileged. He was a strong advocate for the use of Esperanto in the cause of world peace, translating several of his publications into Esperanto.

== Personal life ==
He had a wife, Marie, and five children including his daughter Else, who married Köppen's student Alfred Wegener. Marie's sister Sophie and her children moved in with the Köppens in 1888.

== Bibliography ==
- Köppen, Wladimir and Wegener, Alfred (1924): The Climates of the Geological Past Facsimile of the German original and English translation of Die Klimate der Geologischen Vorzeit. Berlin; Stuttgart: Gebr. Borntraeger. ISBN 978-3-443-01088-1.
- Köppen, Wladimir; Jörn Thiede (2018): Wladimir Köppen: Scholar for Life (Ein Gelehrtenleben für die Meteorologie). Borntraeger Science Publishers. ISBN 978-3-443-01100-0, 316pp. English and German language biography of Wladimir Köppen, highlighting his research with an updated bibliography.

== See also ==
- List of Russian meteorologists

== Sources ==
- Allaby, Michael (2000). Encyclopedia of Weather and Climate. New York: Facts On File, Inc. ISBN 0-8160-4071-0.
- Wille, Robert-Jan Wille (2017): Colonizing the Free Atmosphere: Wladimir Köppen’s ‘Aerology’, the German Maritime Observatory, and the Emergence of a Trans-Imperial Network of Weather Balloons and Kites, 1873–1906, History of Meteorology 8 (2017).
