= Léon Teisserenc de Bort =

French meteorologist

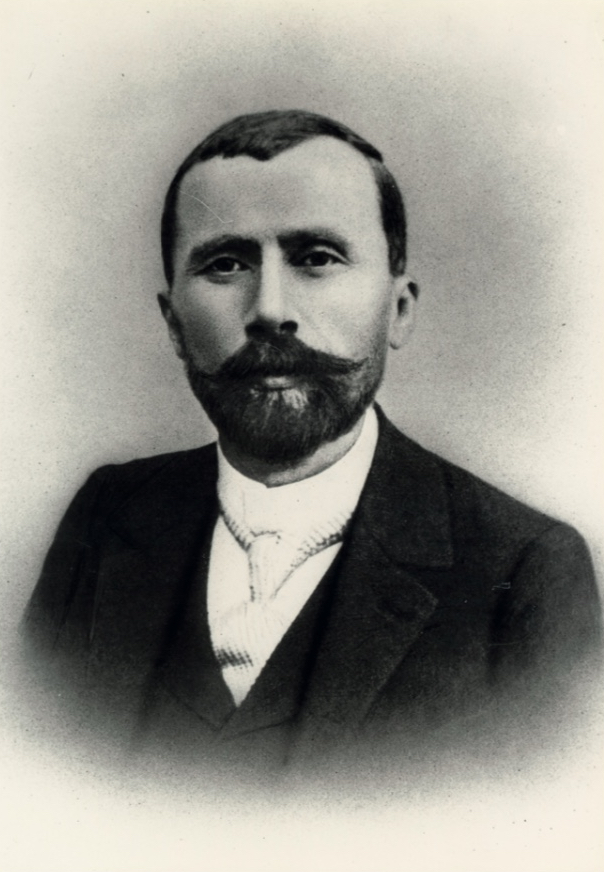
- Léon Teisserenc de Bort
- Born: Léon Philippe Teisserenc de Bort; 5 November 1855; Paris, France
- Died: 2 January 1913 (aged 57); Cannes, France
- Known for: stratosphere
- Awards: Symons Gold Medal (1908)
- Scientific career
- Fields: Meteorology

Léon Philippe Teisserenc de Bort (5 November 1855 – 2 January 1913) was a French meteorologist and a pioneer in the field of aerology. Together with Richard Assmann (1845-1918), he is credited as co-discoverer of the stratosphere, as both men announced their discovery during the same time period in 1902. Teisserenc de Bort pioneered the use of unmanned instrumented balloons and was the first to identify the region in the atmosphere around 8-17 kilometers of height where the lapse rate reaches zero, known today as the tropopause.

== Early life and career ==
He was the son of an engineer. He began his scientific career in 1880, when he entered the meteorological department of the Bureau Central Météorologique (Administrative Centre of National Meteorology, a department of the French government) in Paris under E. E. N. Mascart. In 1883, 1885 and 1887 he made journeys to North Africa to study geology and terrestrial magnetism, and during this period published some important charts of the distribution of pressure at a height of 4,000 metres. Between 1892 and 1896, Teisserenc de Bort was chief meteorologist to the Bureau.

== Instrumented balloons pioneer ==
After his resignation from the Bureau in 1896, he established a private meteorological observatory in Trappes near Versailles. There he carried out investigations on clouds and the problems of the upper air. He conducted experiments with high-flying instrumented hydrogen balloons and was one of the first people to use such devices.

In 1898, Teisserenc de Bort published an important paper in Comptes Rendus detailing his researches by means of balloons into the constitution of the atmosphere. He noticed that while the air temperature decreased steadily up to approximately 11 kilometers of height, it remained constant above that altitude (up to the highest points he could reach). In other words, he discovered an indication of a temperature inversion or at least of a zero lapse rate above this altitude. For many years he was uncertain whether he discovered a true physical phenomenon or whether his measurements suffered from a systematic bias (indeed, the first measurements did have a positive temperature bias as the instruments were liable to radiative heating by solar radiation). That is why Teisserenc de Bort carried out 200+ more balloon experiments (with a substantial part of them being held during the night to eliminate radiative heating) until 1902, when he suggested that the atmosphere was divided into two layers.

== Troposphere and stratosphere ==
During the years that followed, he named the two layers of the atmosphere known as the "troposphere" and the "stratosphere". This naming convention has since been maintained, with (higher-altitude) layers that were subsequently discovered being given names of this sort. After Teisserenc de Bort's death in 1913, the heirs donated the observatory to the state so that the research tasks could be continued.

== Additional investigations ==
He also carried out investigations near Viborg in Denmark 1902-1903, in Sweden and over the Zuider Zee, the Mediterranean and the tropical region of the Atlantic, and fitted out a special vessel in order to study the currents above the trade winds. He was elected a fellow of the Royal Meteorological Society in 1903, honorary member in 1909, and was awarded the Symons Gold Medal of the Society in 1908. He collaborated with Hugo Hildebrandsson in Les bases de la météorologie dynamique (1907).

== Named after him ==
- The crater Teisserenc on the Moon.
- The crater Teisserenc de Bort on Mars.

== See also ==
- Timeline of hydrogen technologies
