= CZA =

CZA may refer to:

- Central Zoo Authority of India
- Circumzenithal arc, or upside-down rainbow
- Czapek agar, or Czapek medium, a growth medium for propagating fungi
- Coastal Zone Management Act of the United States, sometimes referred to as Coastal Zone Act
