= Circumscribed halo =

Optical phenomenon

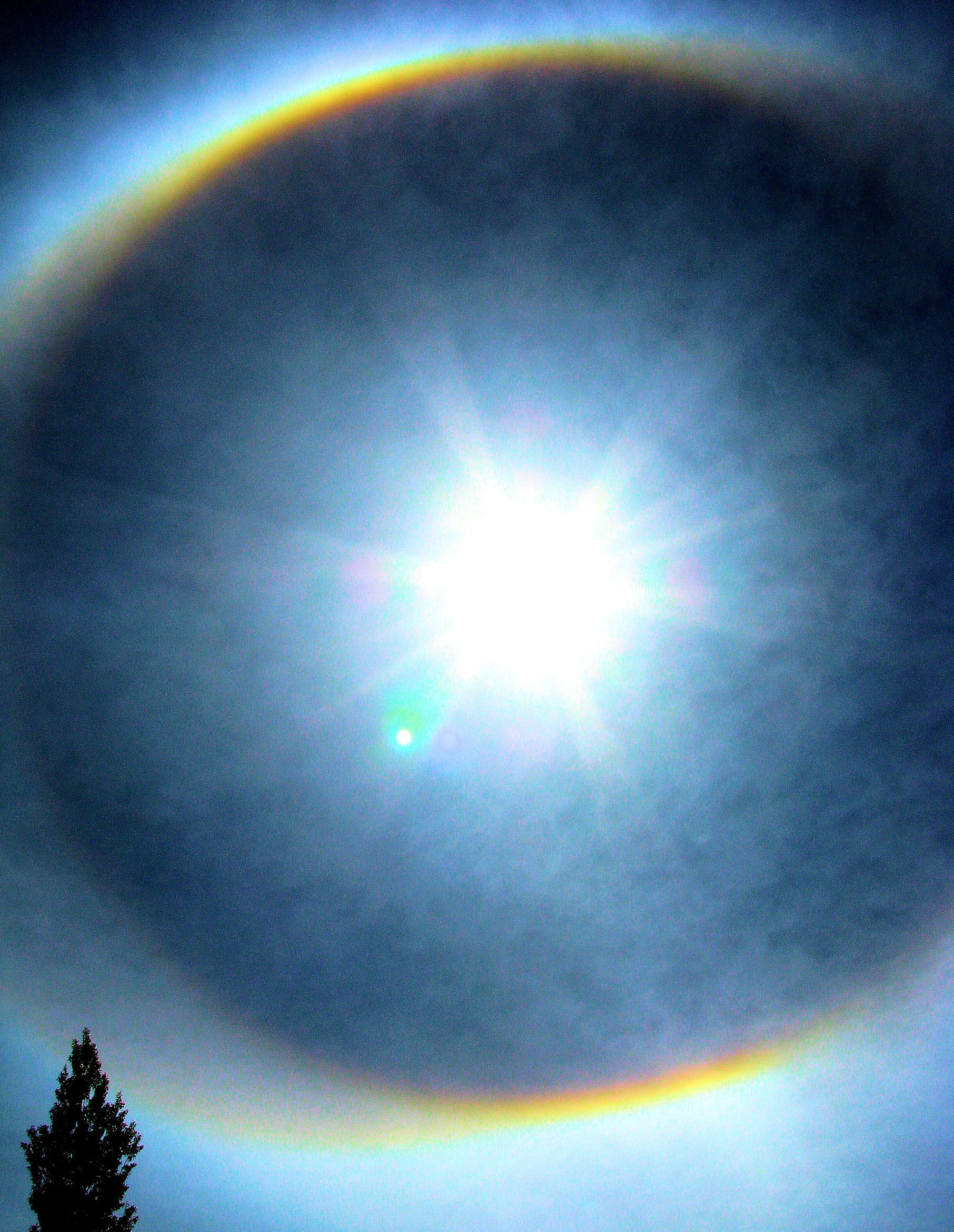
A circumscribed halo (outer ring) together with a 22° halo (inner ring).

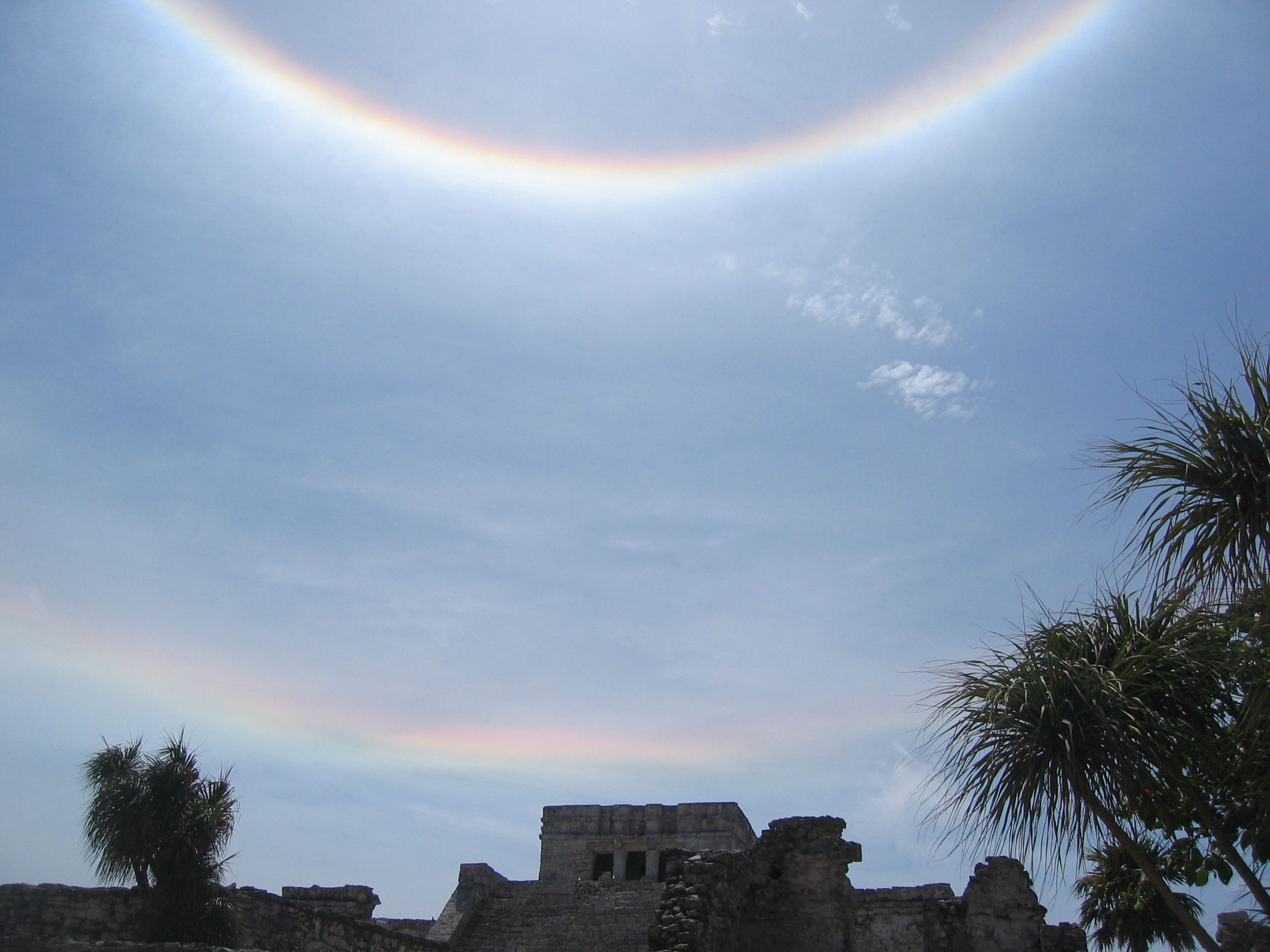
A circumscribed halo (top) together with a circumhorizon arc (bottom)

A circumscribed halo is a type of halo, an optical phenomenon typically in the form of a more or less oval ring that circumscribes the circular 22° halo centred on the Sun or Moon. As the Sun rises above 70° it essentially covers the 22° halo. Like many other halos, it is slightly reddish on the inner edge, facing the Sun or Moon, and bluish on the outer edge.

The shape of the circumscribed halo is strongly dependent on the distance of the Sun or Moon above the horizon. Its top and bottom (i.e., the points directly below and above the Sun or Moon) always lie directly tangential to the 22° halo, but its left and right sides take on different shapes depending on solar (or lunar) elevation. At an elevation between about 35°–50°, the sides form two distinct, downward-drooping "lobes" outside of the 22° halo. As the Sun or Moon rises higher (between c. 50°–70°), the drooping diminishes towards a more regular oval shape. At an elevation of c. 70° or more, the shape of the circumscribed halo approaches a circle, and as such becomes nearly indistinguishable from the 22° halo, only to be identified by its tendency to show more saturated colors than the latter. When the Sun or Moon is at an elevation lower than c. 35°, the circumscribed halo breaks up into the upper tangent and lower tangent arcs.

== See also ==
- Circumzenithal arc
- Circumhorizontal arc
