= 22° halo =

Atmospheric optical phenomenon

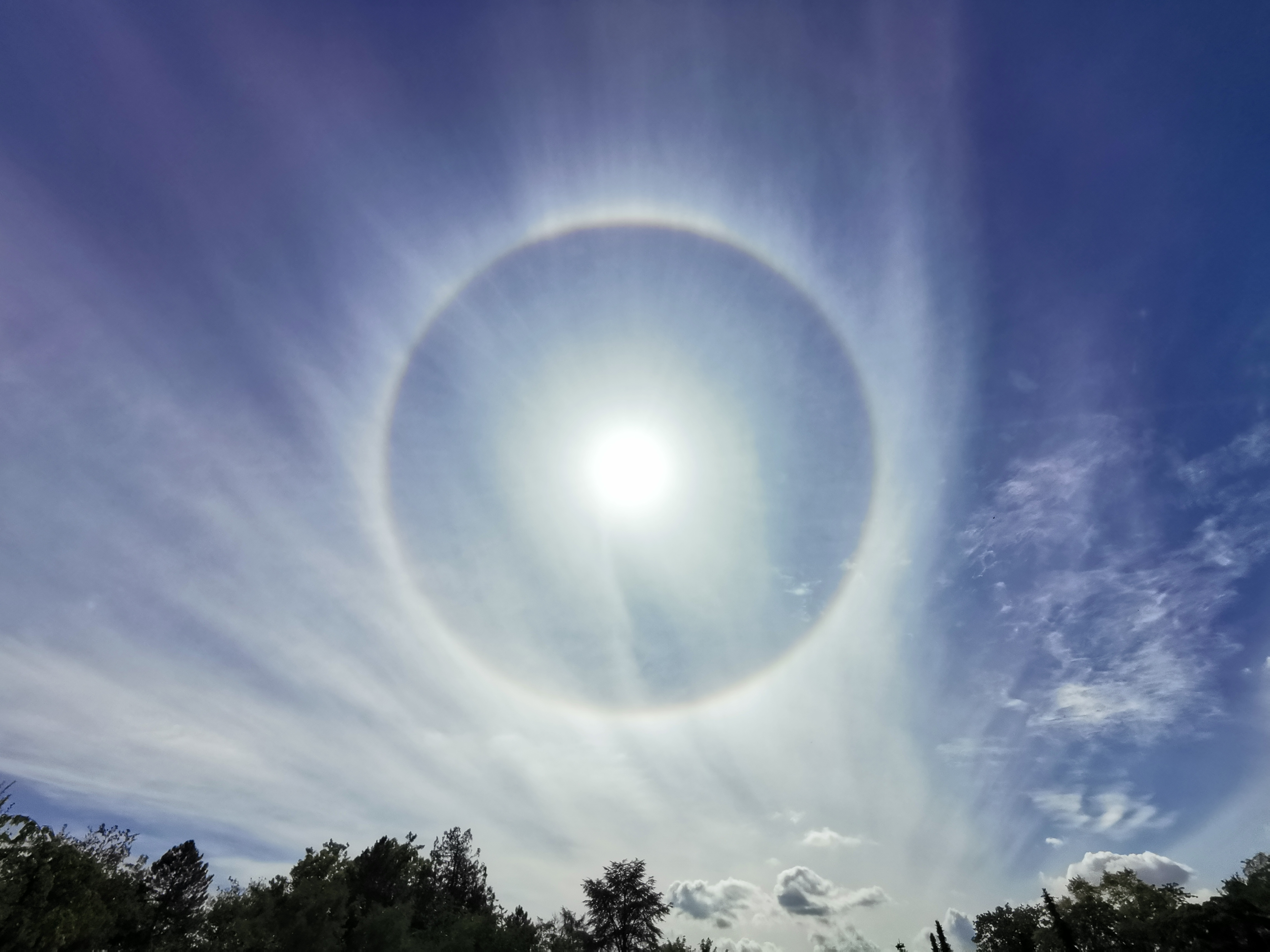
22° halo around the Sun

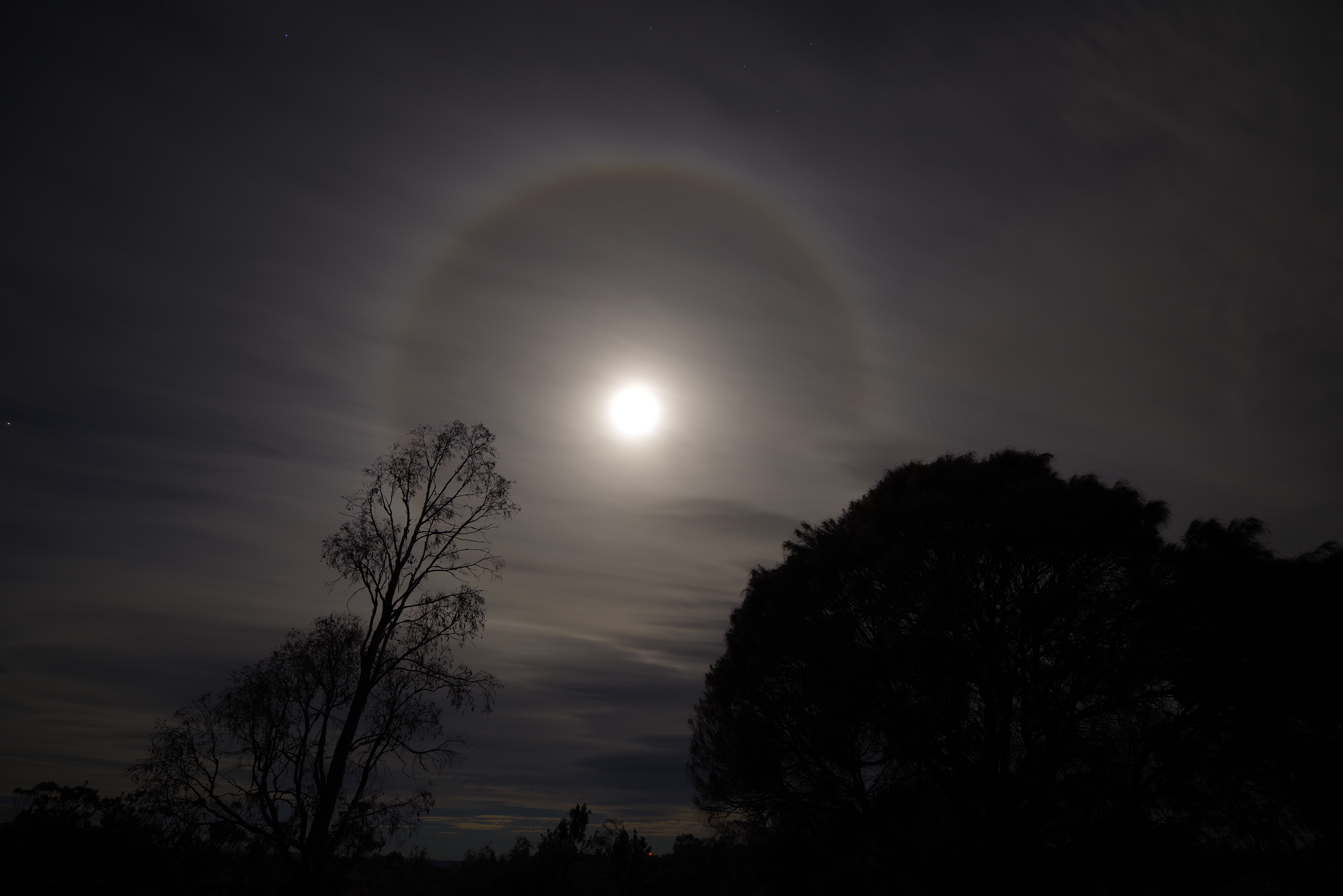
22° halo around the Moon

22º solar halo in the Swiss Alps

A 22° halo is an atmospheric optical phenomenon that consists of a halo with an apparent radius of approximately 22° around the Sun or Moon. Around the Sun, it may also be called a sun halo. Around the Moon, it is also known as a moon ring, storm ring, or winter halo. It forms as sunlight or moonlight is refracted by millions of hexagonal ice crystals suspended in the atmosphere. Its radius, as viewed from Earth, is roughly the length of an outstretched hand at arm's length.

== Formation ==
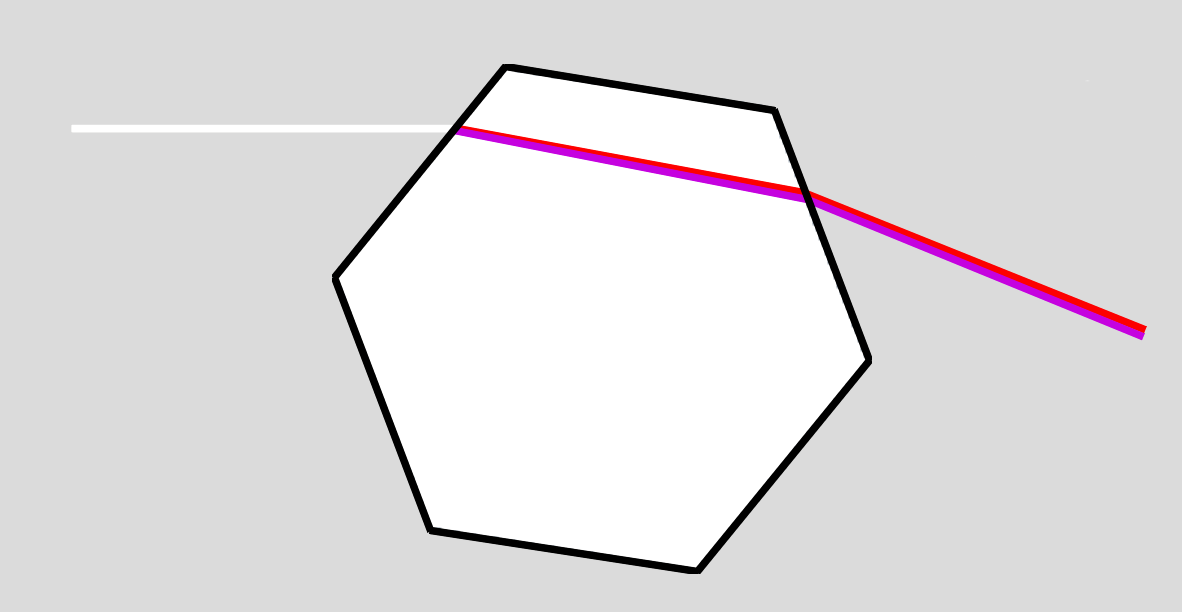
Pathway of light through a hexagonal prism in the optimal angle resulting in minimum deviation

Path of the light from the clouds to the observer

Even though it is one of the most common types of halo, the shape and orientation of the ice crystals responsible for the 22° halo are a topic of debate. Hexagonal, randomly oriented columns are usually put forward as the most likely candidate, but this explanation presents problems, such as the fact that the aerodynamic properties of such crystals lead them to be oriented horizontally rather than randomly. Alternative explanations include the involvement of clusters of bullet-shaped ice columns.

As light passes through the 60° apex angle of the hexagonal ice prisms, it is deflected twice, resulting in deviation angles ranging from 22° to 50°. Given the angle of incidence onto the hexagonal ice prism $\theta_\text{incidence}$ and the refractive index inside the prism $n$, then the angle of deviation $\theta_\text{deviation}$ can be derived from Snell's law:

$$\theta_\text{deviation} = \theta_\text{incidence} + \sin^{-1}\left[n\sin\left(\frac{\pi}{3}-\sin^{-1}\frac{\sin \theta_\text{incidence}}{n}\right)\right]-\frac{\pi}{3}.$$

For $n$ = 1.309, the angle of minimum deviation is almost 22° (21.76°, when $\theta_\text{incidence}$ = 40.88°). More specifically, the angle of minimum deviation is 21.84° on average ($n$ = 1.31); 21.54° for red light ($n$ = 1.306) and 22.37° for blue light ($n$ = 1.317). This wavelength-dependent variation in refraction causes the inner edge of the circle to be reddish while the outer edge is bluish.

The ice crystals in the clouds all deviate the light similarly, but only the ones from the specific ring at 22 degrees contribute to the effect for an observer at a set distance. As no light is refracted at angles smaller than 22°, the sky is darker inside the halo.

Another way to intuitively understand the formation of the 22° halo is to consider the following logic:

- All rays from the Sun/Moon are incoming in a parallel manner towards the observer.
- We can consider a specific case when the source is right on top of the sky.
- Hexagonal water crystals can take on any orientation. But any rotation beyond 30° would be redundant when analyzing the angles subtended by the emerging rays. This means that for all the incoming vertical rays, we only need to consider incident angles in the range 30° to 60° that are incumbent on one edge of the hexagonal crystal; these are the ones that will reach the observer.
- For the above range of incident angles, we can find the angle of the outgoing ray with respect to the vertical—which in fact is the angle subtended at the eye of the observer.
- Outgoing ray angles (in the graphs on the right in the figure below) were obtained from the equation at the bottom. For a majority of rotation angles, the average of outgoing ray angles for red hovers around 22° and is slightly higher for blue.

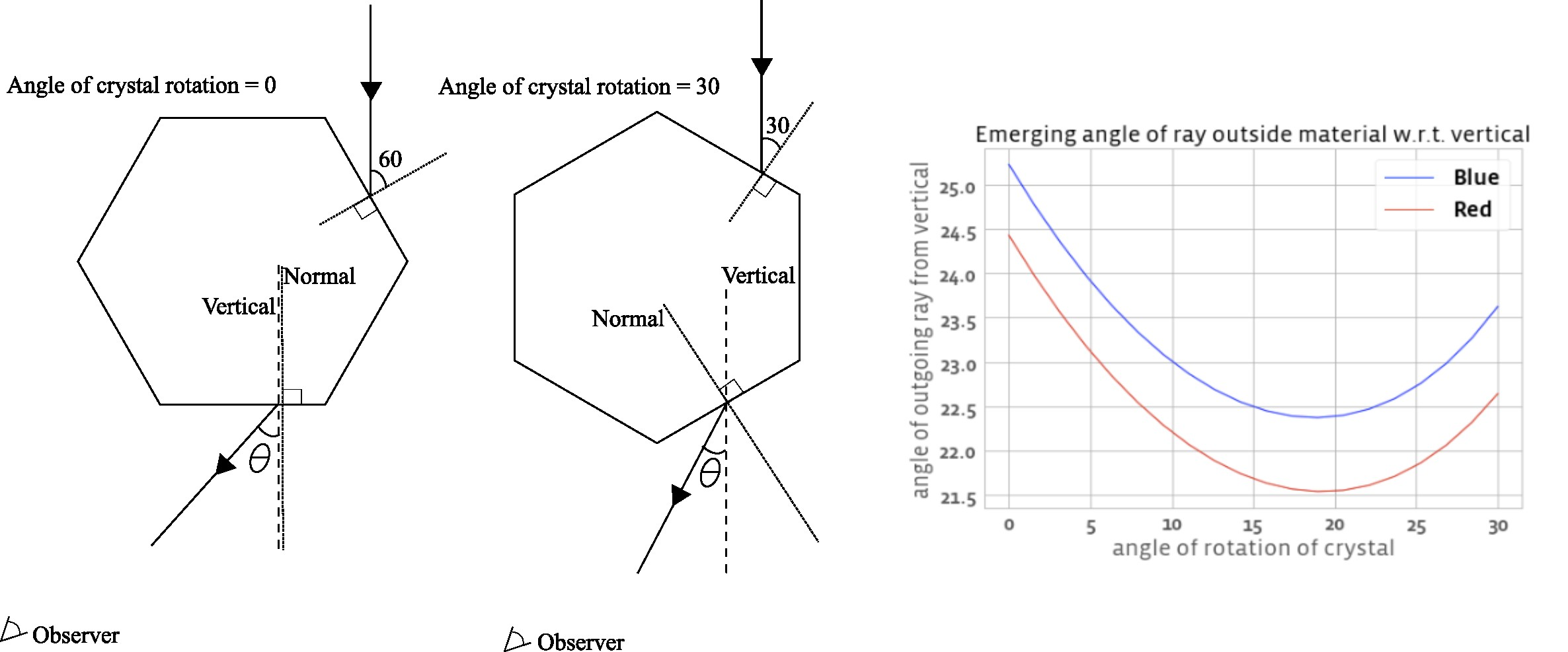
Possible orientations of water crystals and resulting outgoing ray angles

Angle of rotation = $\alpha$

$$\theta = \sin^{-1}\left[n\sin\left(\frac{\pi}{3}-\sin^{-1}\frac{\sin \left(\pi/3-\alpha\right)}{n}\right)\right]-\alpha.$$

Another phenomenon resulting in a ring around the Sun or Moon—and therefore sometimes confused with the 22° halo—is the corona. Unlike the 22° halo, however, it is produced by water droplets instead of ice crystals and is much smaller and more colorful.

== Weather relation ==
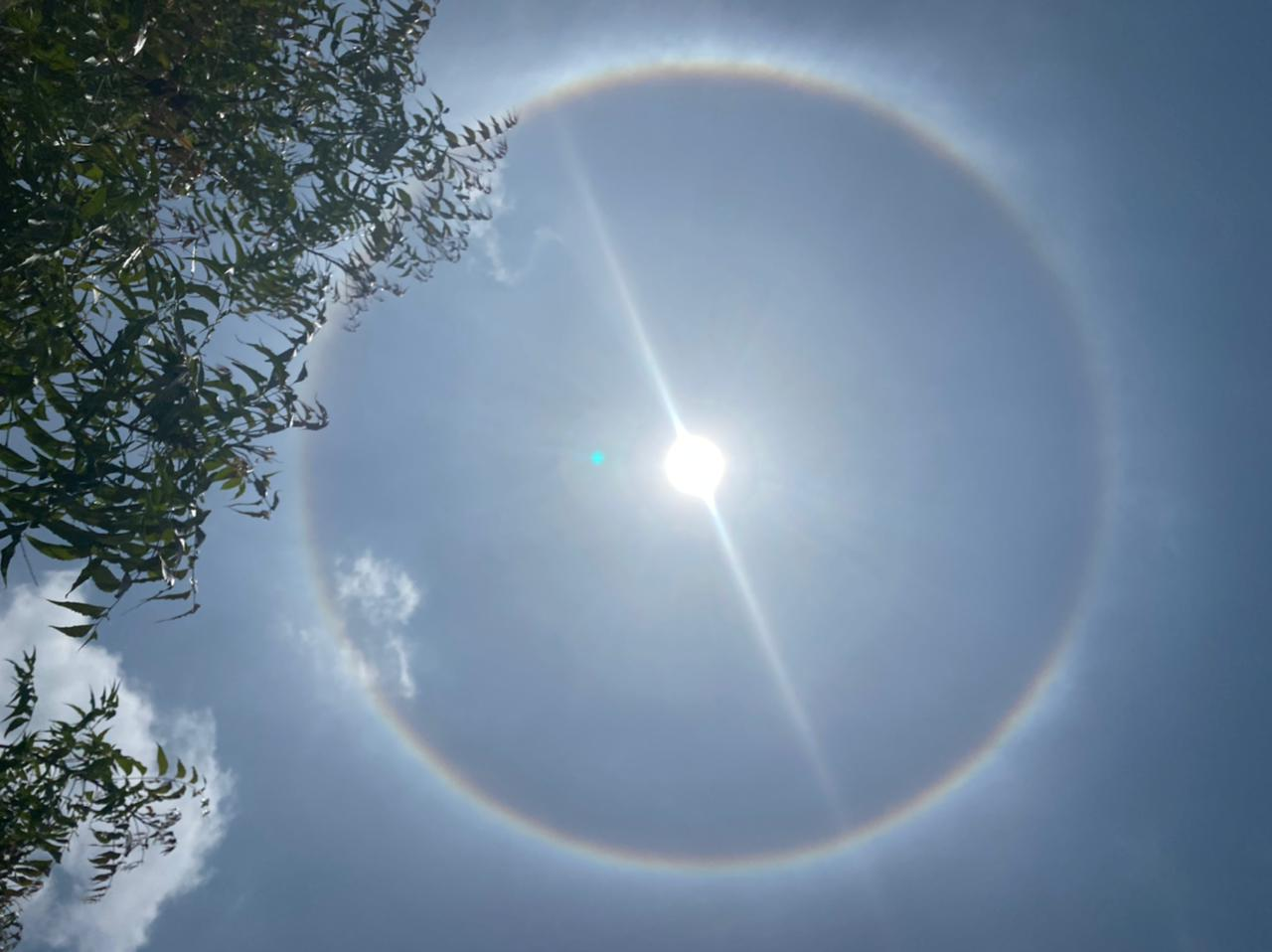
22° solar halo with very thin cirrostratus clouds

In folklore, moon rings are said to warn of approaching storms. Like other ice halos, 22° halos appear when the sky is covered by thin cirrus or cirrostratus clouds that often come a few days before a large storm front. However, the same clouds can also occur without any associated weather change, making a 22° halo unreliable as a sign of bad weather.

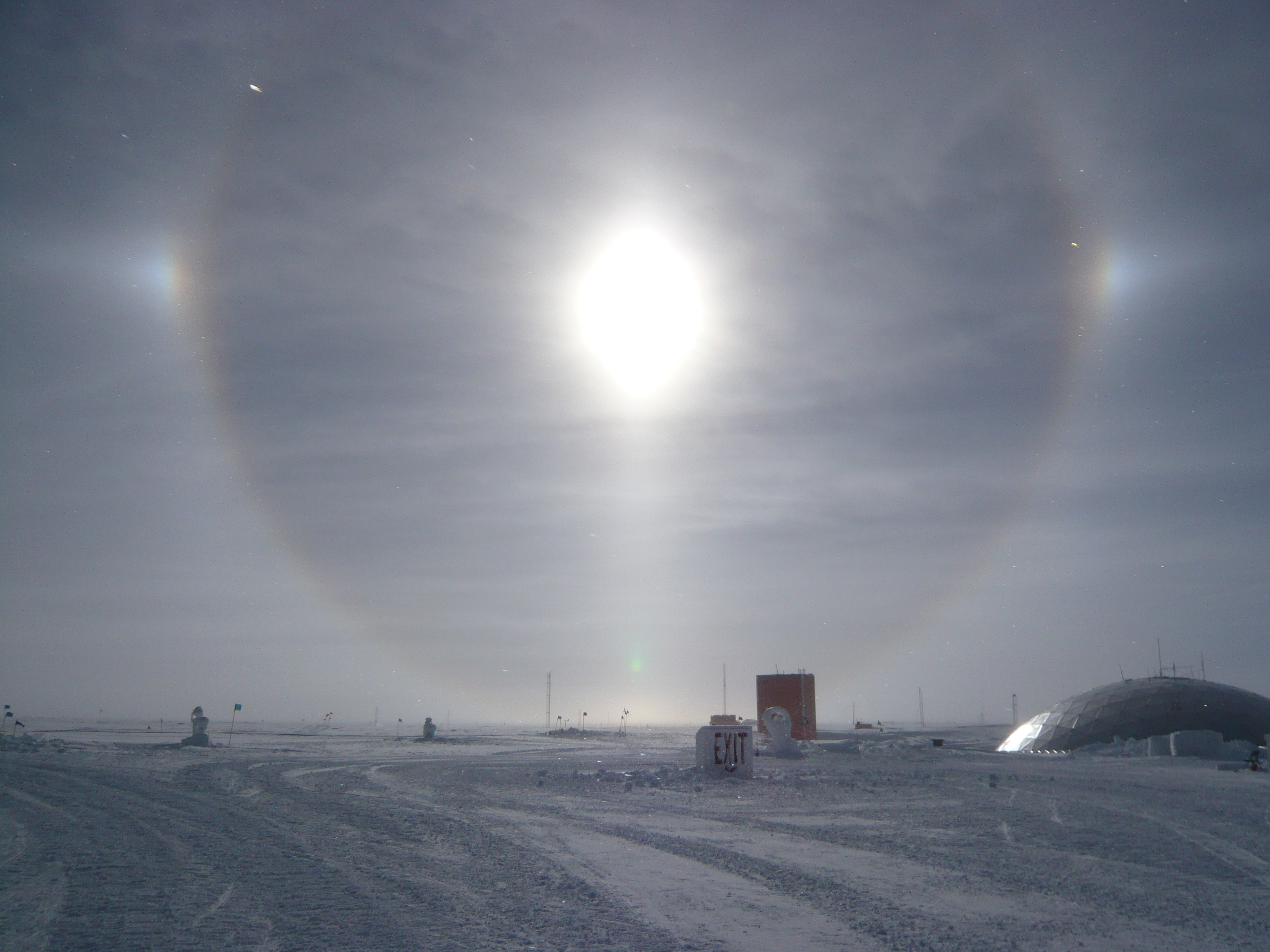
22° solar halo with parhelia and lower tangent arc

== See also ==
- 46° halo
- Circumzenithal arc
- Circumhorizontal arc
- Sun dog
- Parhelic circle
- Moon dog
- Moonbow
