= Kern arc =

Atmospheric optical phenomenon

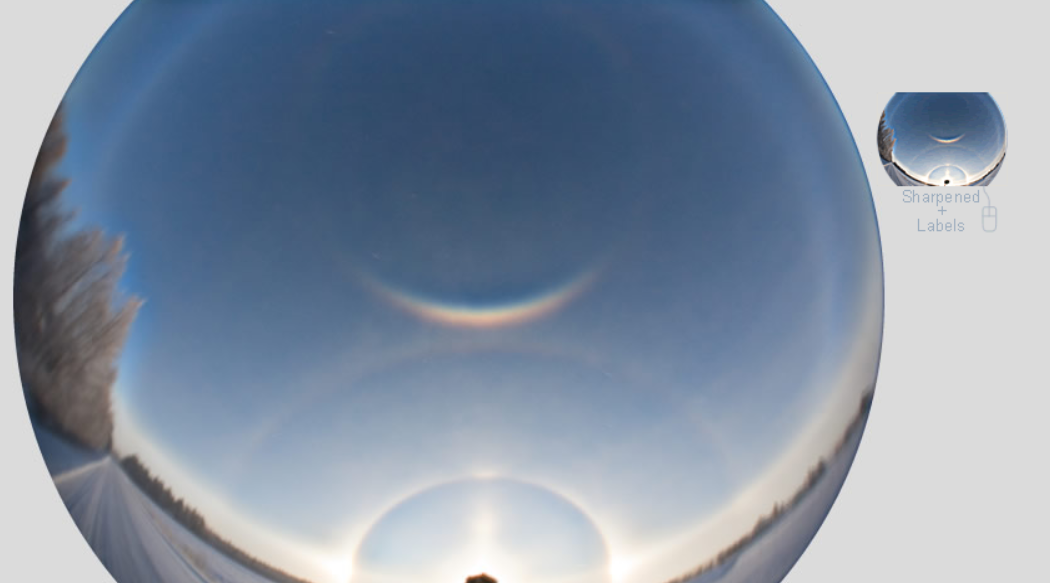
A rare picture of the Kern arc

The Kern arc is an extremely rare atmospheric optical phenomenon belonging to the family of ice crystal halos. It is a complete and faint circle around the zenith, in contrast to the related and much more common circumzenithal arc, which is only ever a partial circle.

The Kern arc is named after H.F.A. Kern in the Netherlands, who first reported it on October 8, 1895. Since then it has been reported on six occasions.

It is formed by rays entering the top faces of horizontal plate crystals and leaving through a near vertical side face. Kern arc rays undergo an internal reflection off a side face inclined at 60° to the exit face. Near triangular hexagonal crystals with three alternate side faces much shorter than the others allow the Kern arc to occur.

The first photographs of the Kern arc were taken by Marko Mikkilä close to Vuokatti Ski Resort, Sotkamo, Finland on 17 November 2007. The photographs were in natural sunlight taken from an artificial cloud of ice crystals created by snowguns. At the Vuokatti Ski Resort about 100 snowguns may operate at one time. The temperature was −15 to −18 °C in clear sky and almost no wind. Nikon D70 and Nikon FM cameras were used with Sigma 8mm EX F4, Sigma 15mm EX F2.8 lenses. Some samples of ice crystals were also collected, confirming their nearly triangular base.

Mikkilä's photographs were first published in Tähdet ja avaruus-magazine 1/2008. The magazine is published by URSA, the Finnish association of astronomy.

== See also ==
- Halo (optical phenomenon)
- Circumzenithal arc
