= Polar stratospheric cloud =

Clouds occurring in the stratosphere in high-latitude regions

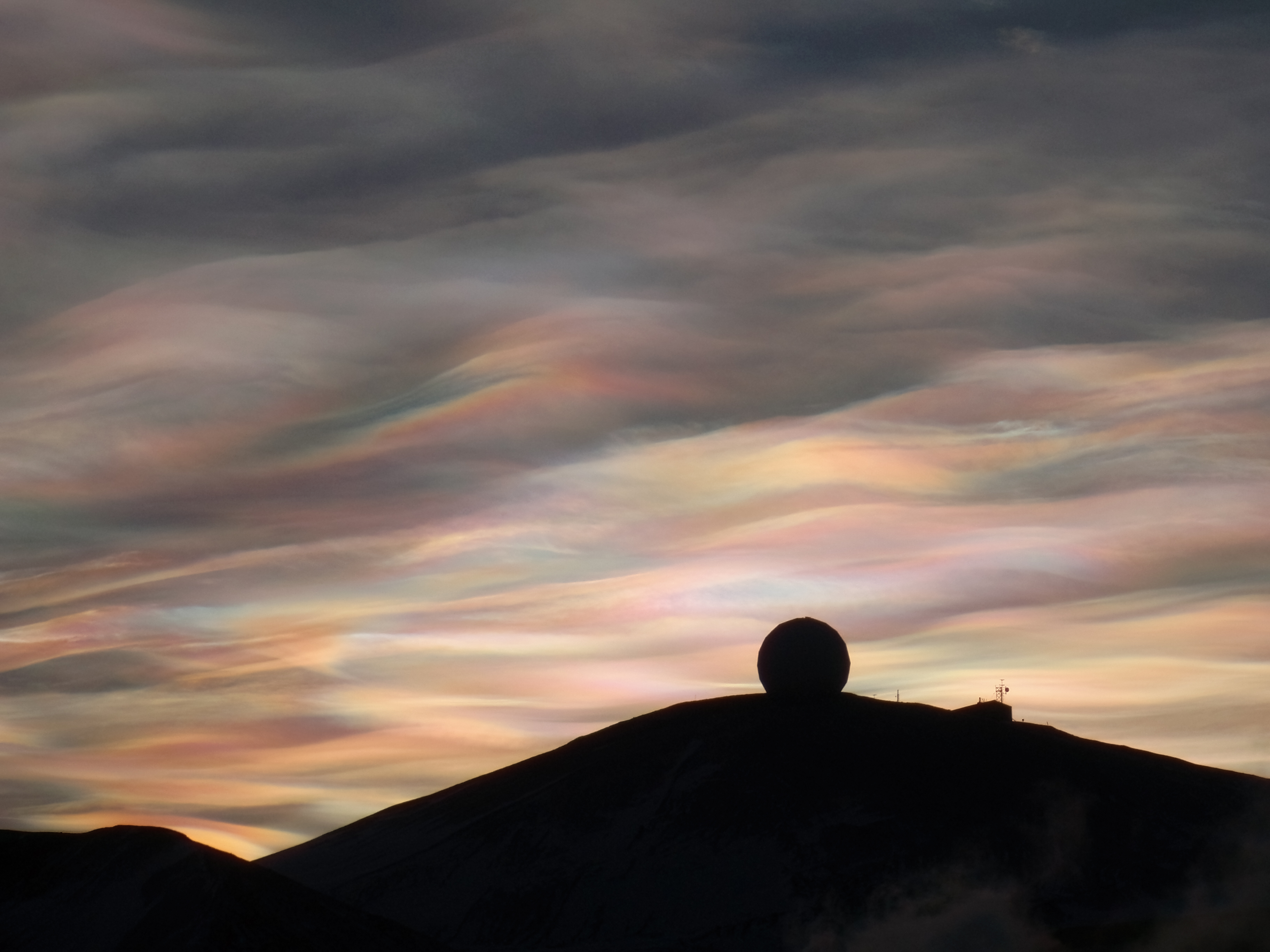
- Antarctic stratospheric cloud (nacreous clouds)
- Abbreviation: PSC
- Altitude: 15,000–25,000 m (49,000–82,000 ft)
- Classification: Other
- Appearance: Glowing brightly with vivid iridescent colours
- Precipitation: No

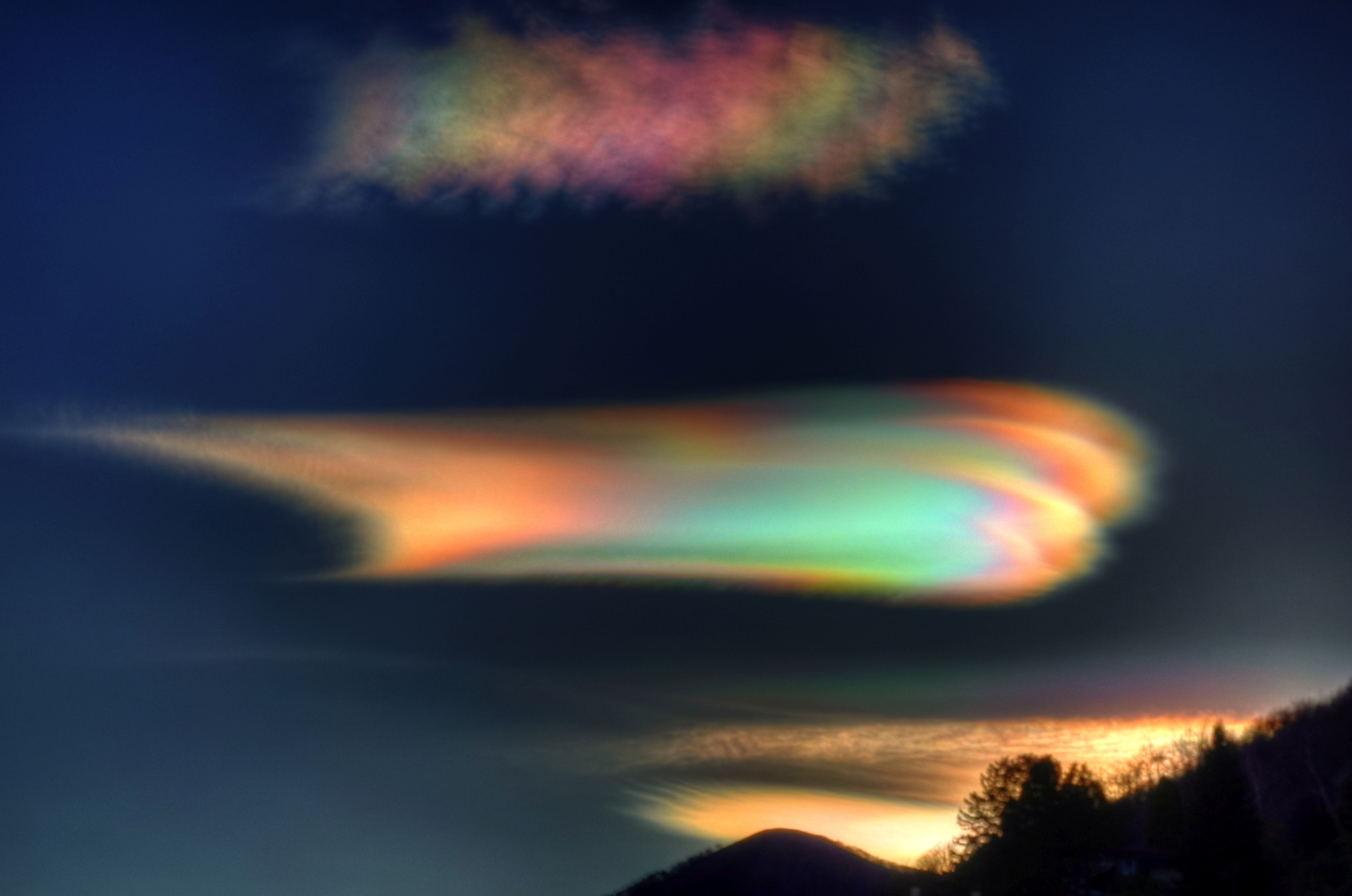
First documented appearance of a polar stratospheric cloud over Switzerland and Italy, seen from Brissago, Ticino, Switzerland on 22 December 2023

A polar stratospheric cloud (PSC) is a cloud that forms in the winter polar stratosphere at altitudes from 15,000 to 25,000 m (49,000 to 82,000 ft). They are best observed during civil twilight, when the Sun is between 1° and 6° below the horizon, as well as in winter and in more northerly latitudes. One main type of PSC is composed of mostly supercooled droplets of water and nitric acid and is implicated in the formation of ozone holes. The other main type consists only of ice crystals, which are not harmful. This type of PSC is also called nacreous cloud (/ˈnækreɪəs/; from nacre, or mother of pearl), due to its iridescence.

== Formation ==
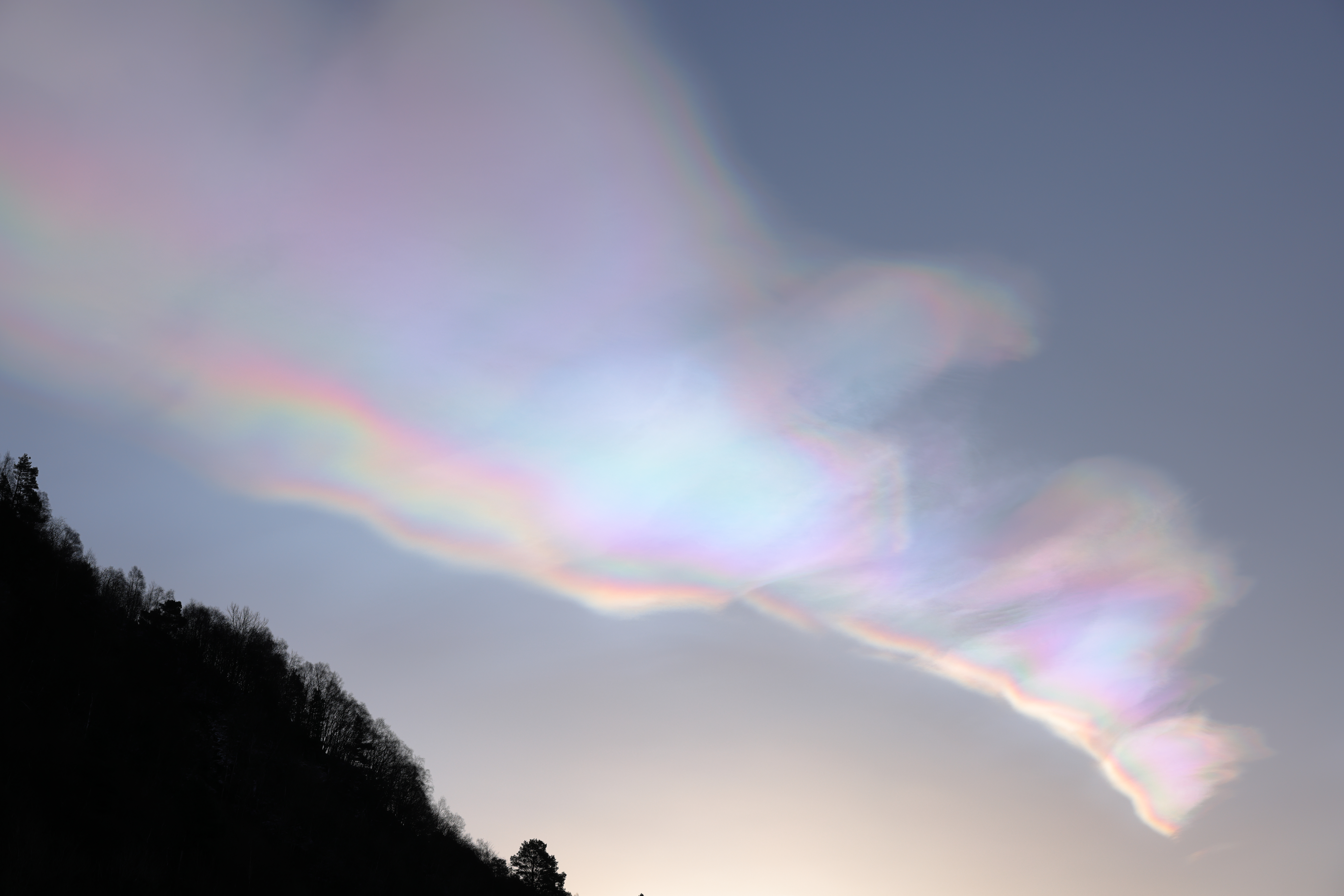
Polar stratospheric clouds over Western Norway

The stratosphere is very dry; unlike the troposphere, it rarely allows clouds to form. In the extreme cold of the polar winter, however, stratospheric clouds of different types may form, which are classified according to their physical state (super-cooled liquid or ice) and chemical composition.

Due to their high altitude and the curvature of the surface of the Earth, these clouds will receive sunlight from below the horizon and reflect it to the ground, shining brightly well before dawn or after dusk.

PSCs form at very low temperatures, below −78 °C (−108 °F). These temperatures can occur in the lower stratosphere in polar winter. In the Antarctic, temperatures below −88 °C (−126 °F) frequently cause type II PSCs. Such low temperatures are rarer in the Arctic. In the Northern Hemisphere, the generation of lee waves by mountains may locally cool the lower stratosphere and lead to the formation of lenticular (lens-shaped) PSCs.

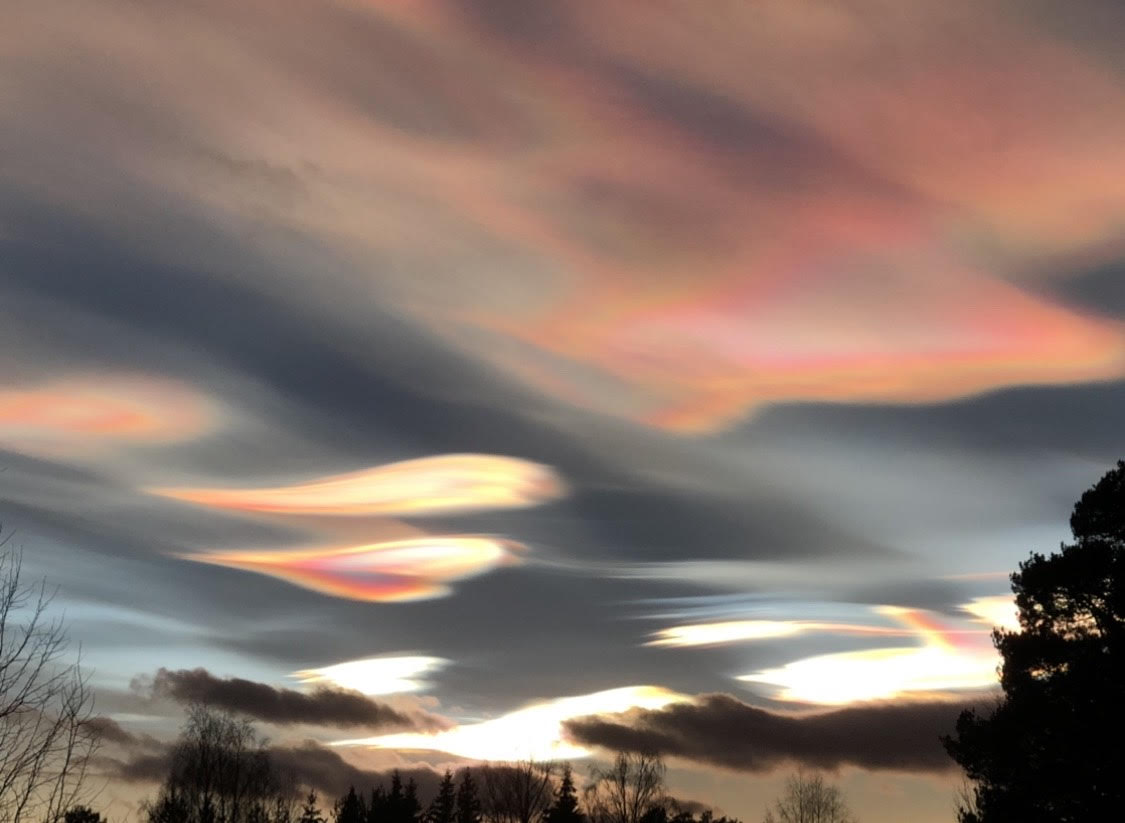
Polar stratospheric cloud in Elverum, Norway.

Forward scattering of sunlight within the clouds produces a pearly-white appearance. Particles within the optically thin clouds cause coloured interference fringes by diffraction. The visibility of the colours may be enhanced with a polarising filter.

== Types ==
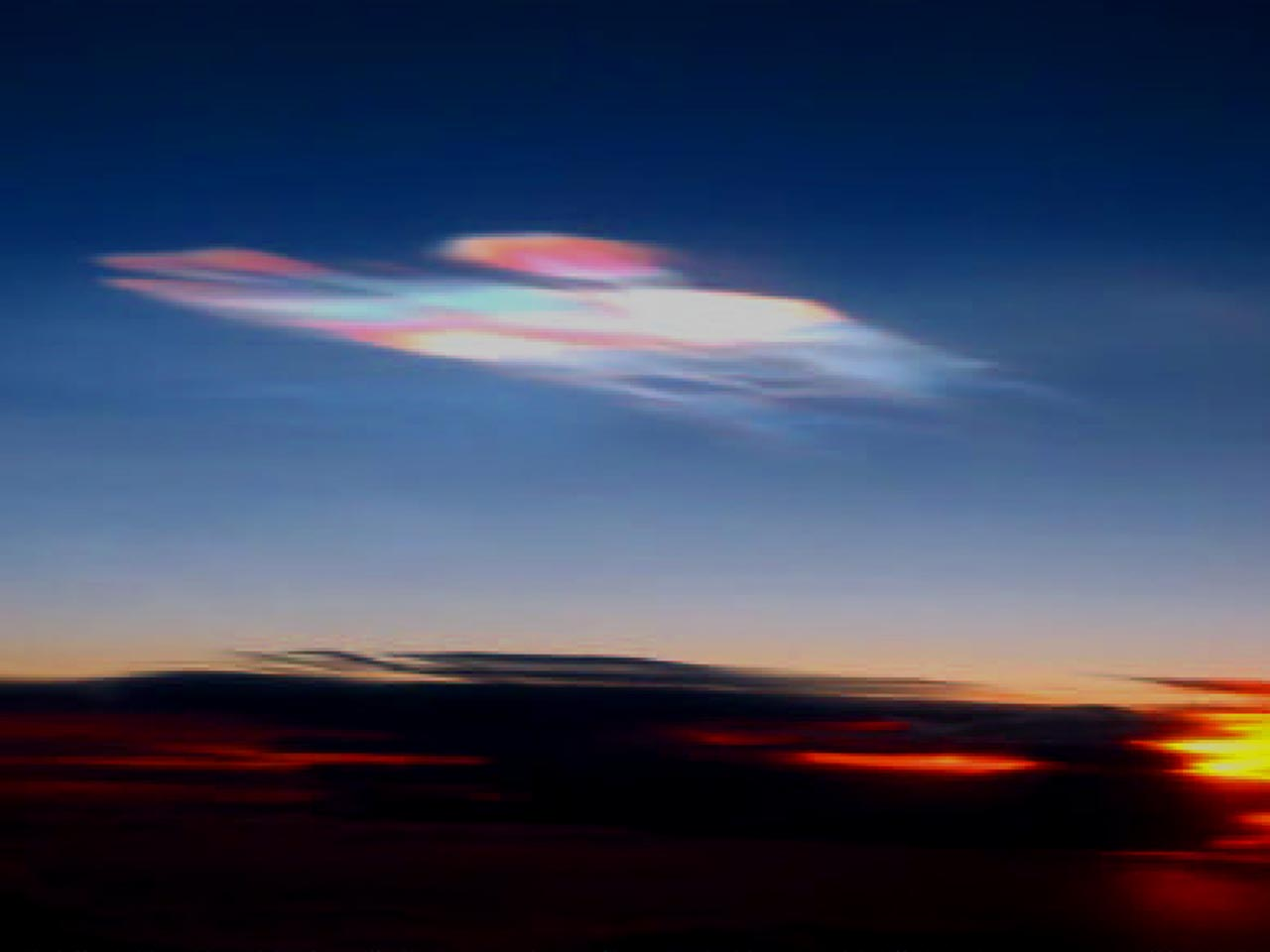
A lenticular type II (water) PSC showing iridescence

PSCs are classified into two main types, each of which consists of several subtypes.

- Type I clouds have a generally stratiform appearance resembling cirrostratus or haze. They are sometimes sub-classified according to their chemical composition which can be measured using LIDAR. The technique also determines the height and ambient temperature of the cloud. They contain water, nitric acid and/or sulfuric acid and are a source of polar ozone depletion. The effects on ozone depletion arise because they support chemical reactions that produce active chlorine which catalyzes ozone destruction, and also because they remove gaseous nitric acid, perturbing nitrogen and chlorine cycles in a way which increases ozone depletion.
  - Type Ia clouds consist of large, aspherical particles, consisting of nitric acid trihydrate (NAT).
  - Type Ib clouds contain small, spherical particles (non-depolarising), of a liquid supercooled ternary solution (STS) of sulfuric acid, nitric acid, and water.
  - Type Ic clouds consist of metastable water-rich nitric acid in a solid phase.
- Type II clouds, which are very rarely observed in the Arctic, have cirriform and lenticular sub-types and consist of water ice only.

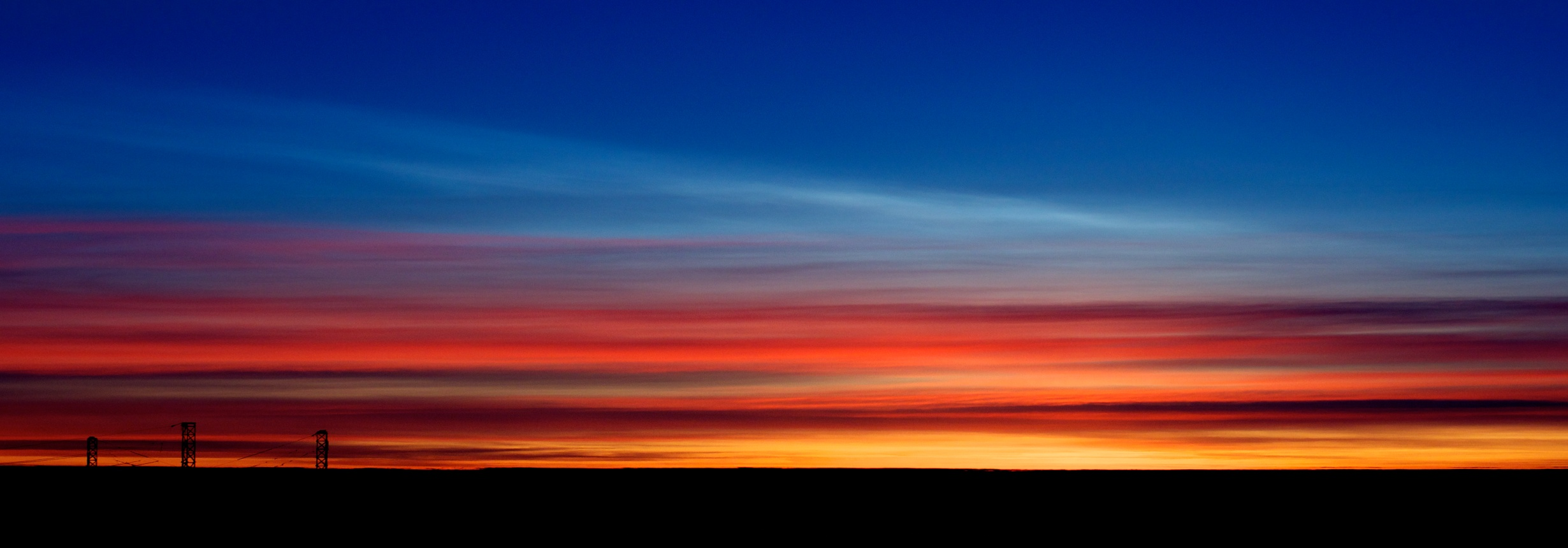
A stratiform type I PSC (white cloud above the orange tropospheric clouds), showing fine horizontal structures in the veil

Only Type II clouds are necessarily nacreous whereas Type I clouds can be iridescent under certain conditions, just as any other cloud. The World Meteorological Organization no longer uses the alpha-numeric nomenclature seen in this article, and distinguishes only between super-cooled stratiform acid-water PSCs and cirriform-lenticular water ice nacreous PSCs.

== See also ==
- Aurora
- Circumhorizontal arc
- Cloud iridescence
- Noctilucent clouds
