= Circumhorizontal arc =

Optical phenomenon

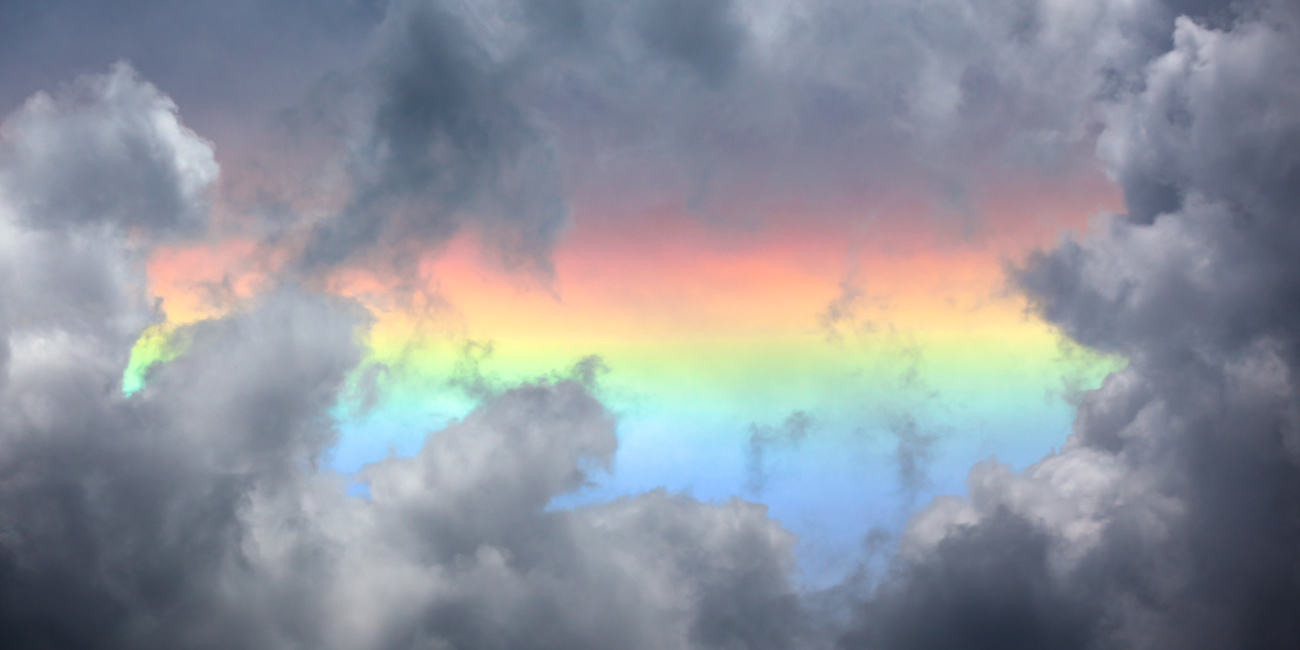
Circumhorizontal arc over the Nepalese Himalaya

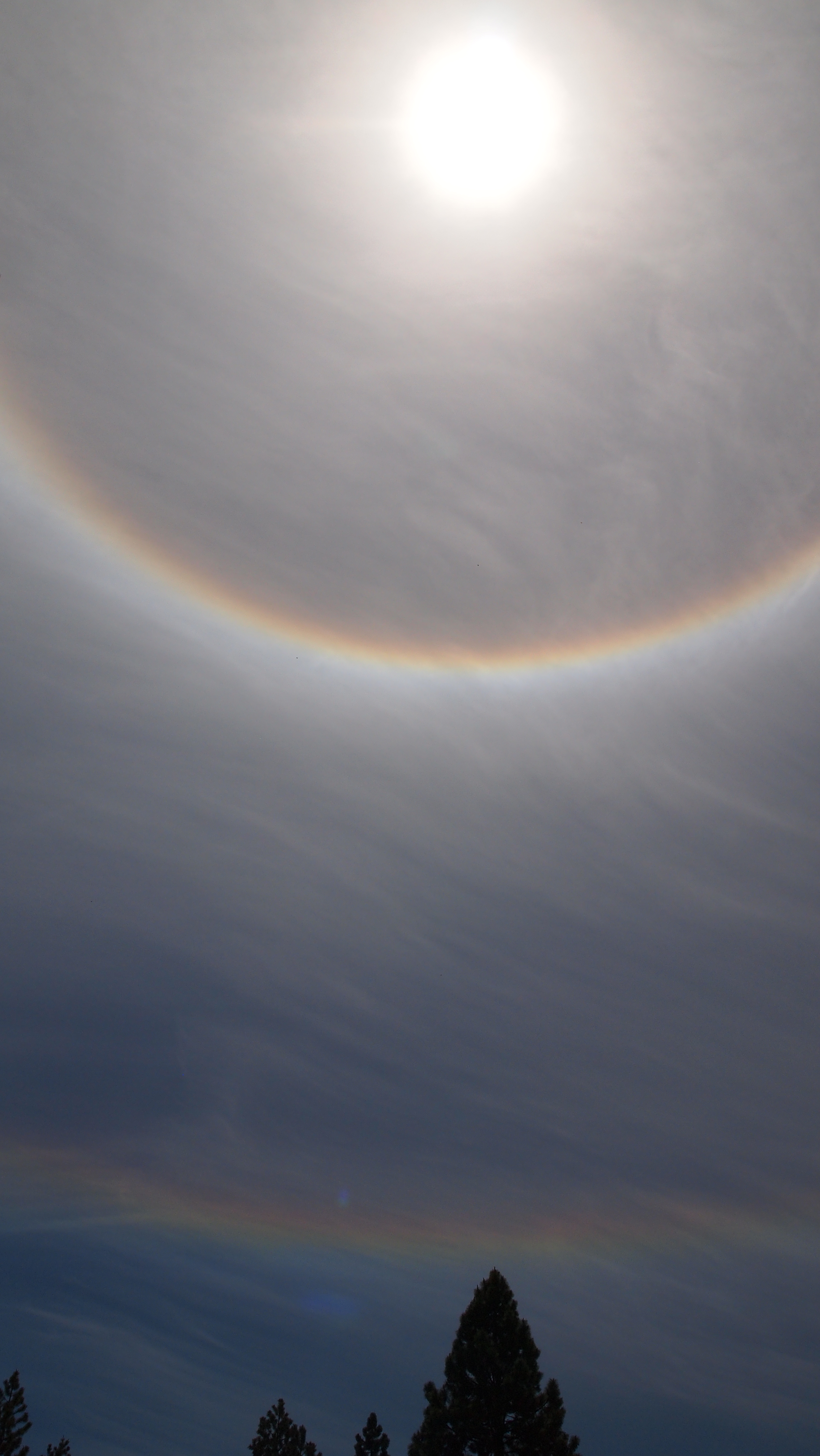
A circumhorizontal arc (bottom) in relation to a circumscribed halo (top), Oregon.

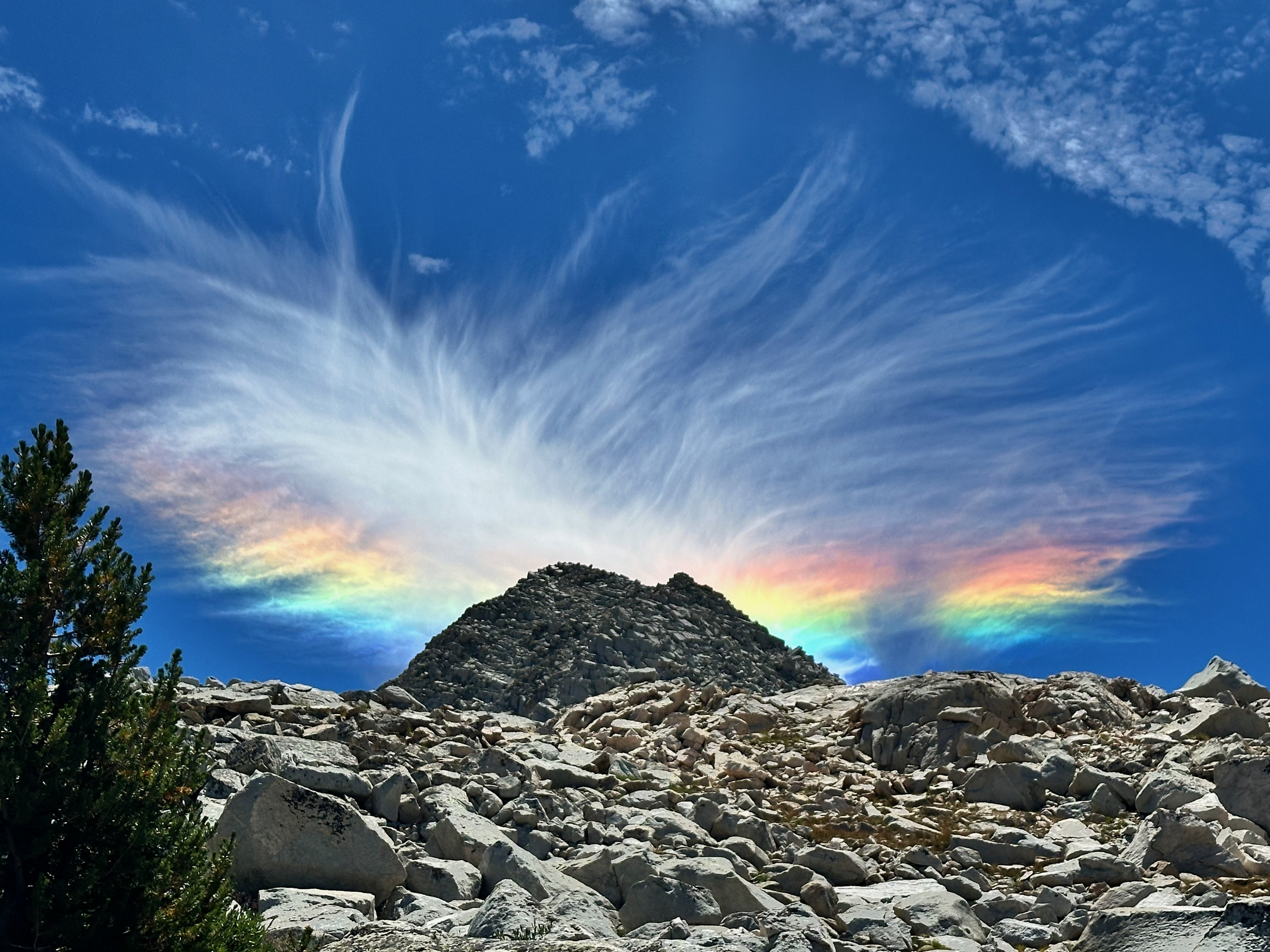
Circumhorizontal Arc over peak 12225 in the Sierra Mountains of California

A circumhorizontal arc is an optical phenomenon that belongs to the family of ice halos formed by the refraction of sunlight or moonlight in plate-shaped ice crystals suspended in the atmosphere, typically in actual cirrus or cirrostratus clouds. In its full form, the arc has the appearance of a large, brightly spectrum-coloured band (red being the topmost colour) running parallel to the horizon, located far below the Sun or Moon. The distance between the arc and the Sun or Moon is twice as far as the common 22-degree halo. Often, when the halo-forming cloud is small or patchy, only fragments of the arc are seen. As with all halos, it can be caused by the Sun as well as (but much more rarely) the Moon.

Other currently accepted names for the circumhorizontal arc are circumhorizon arc or lower symmetric 46° plate arc. The misleading term "fire rainbow" is sometimes used to describe this phenomenon, although it is neither a rainbow, nor related in any way to fire. The term, apparently coined in 2006, may originate in the occasional appearance of the arc as "flames" in the sky, when it occurs in fragmentary cirrus clouds.

== Formation ==
The halo is formed by sunlight entering horizontally-oriented, flat, hexagonal ice crystals through a vertical side face and leaving through the near horizontal bottom face (plate thickness does not affect the formation of the halo). In principle, Parry oriented column crystals may also produce the arc, although this is rare. The 90° inclination between the ray entrance and exit faces produce the well-separated spectral colours. The arc has a considerable angular extent and thus, rarely is complete. When only fragments of a cirrus cloud are in the appropriate sky and sun position, they may appear to shine with spectral colours.

== Frequency ==
How often a circumhorizontal arc is seen depends on the location and the latitude of the observer. In the United States, it is a relatively common halo, seen several times each summer in any one place. In contrast, it is a rare phenomenon in northern Europe for several reasons. Apart from the presence of ice-containing clouds in the right position in the sky, the halo requires that the light source (Sun or Moon) be very high in the sky, at an elevation of 58° or greater. This means that the solar variety of the halo is impossible to see at locations north of 55°N or south of 55°S. A lunar circumhorizon arc might be visible at other latitudes, but is much rarer since it requires a nearly full Moon to produce enough light. At other latitudes the solar circumhorizontal arc is visible, for a greater or lesser time, around the summer solstice. Slots of visibility for different latitudes and locations may be looked up here. For example, in London the sun is only high enough for 140 hours between mid-May and late July, whereas Los Angeles has the sun higher than 58 degrees for 670 hours between late March and late September.

== Artificial circumhorizontal arcs ==
A water glass experiment (known about since at least 1920) may be modified slightly to create an artificial circumhorizontal arc. Illuminating under a very steep angle from below the side face of a nearly completely water-filled cylindrical glass will refract the light into the water. The glass should be situated at the edge of a table. The second refraction at the top water-air interface will then project a hyperbola at a vertical wall behind it. The overall refraction is then equivalent to the refraction through an upright hexagonal plate crystal when the rotational averaging is taken into account. A colourful artificial circumhorizontal arc will then appear projected on the wall. Using a spherical projection screen instead will result in a closer analogy to the natural halo counterpart. Other artificial halos can be created by similar means.

== Similar optical phenomena ==
Circumhorizontal arcs, especially when only fragments can be seen, are sometimes confused with cloud iridescence. This phenomenon also causes clouds to appear multi-coloured, but it originates from diffraction (typically by liquid water droplets or ice crystals) rather than refraction. The two phenomena can be distinguished by several features. Firstly, a circumhorizon arc always has a fixed location in the sky in relation to the Sun or Moon (namely below it at an angle of 46°), while iridescence can occur in different positions (often directly around the Sun or Moon). Secondly, the colour bands in a circumhorizon arc always run horizontally with the red on top, while in iridescence they are much more random in sequence and shape, which roughly follows the contours of the cloud that causes it. Finally, the colours of a circumhorizon arc are pure and spectral (more so than in a rainbow), while the colours in cloud iridescence have a more washed-out, "mother of pearl" appearance.

Confusion with other members of the halo family, such as sun dogs or the circumzenithal arc, may also arise, but these are easily dismissed by their entirely different positions in relation to the Sun or Moon. More difficult is the distinction between the circumhorizontal arc and the infralateral arc, both of which almost entirely overlap when the Sun or Moon is at a high elevation. The difference is that the circumhorizontal arc always runs parallel to the horizon (although pictures typically show it as a curved line due to perspective distortion), whereas the infralateral arc curves upward at its ends.

== Gallery ==
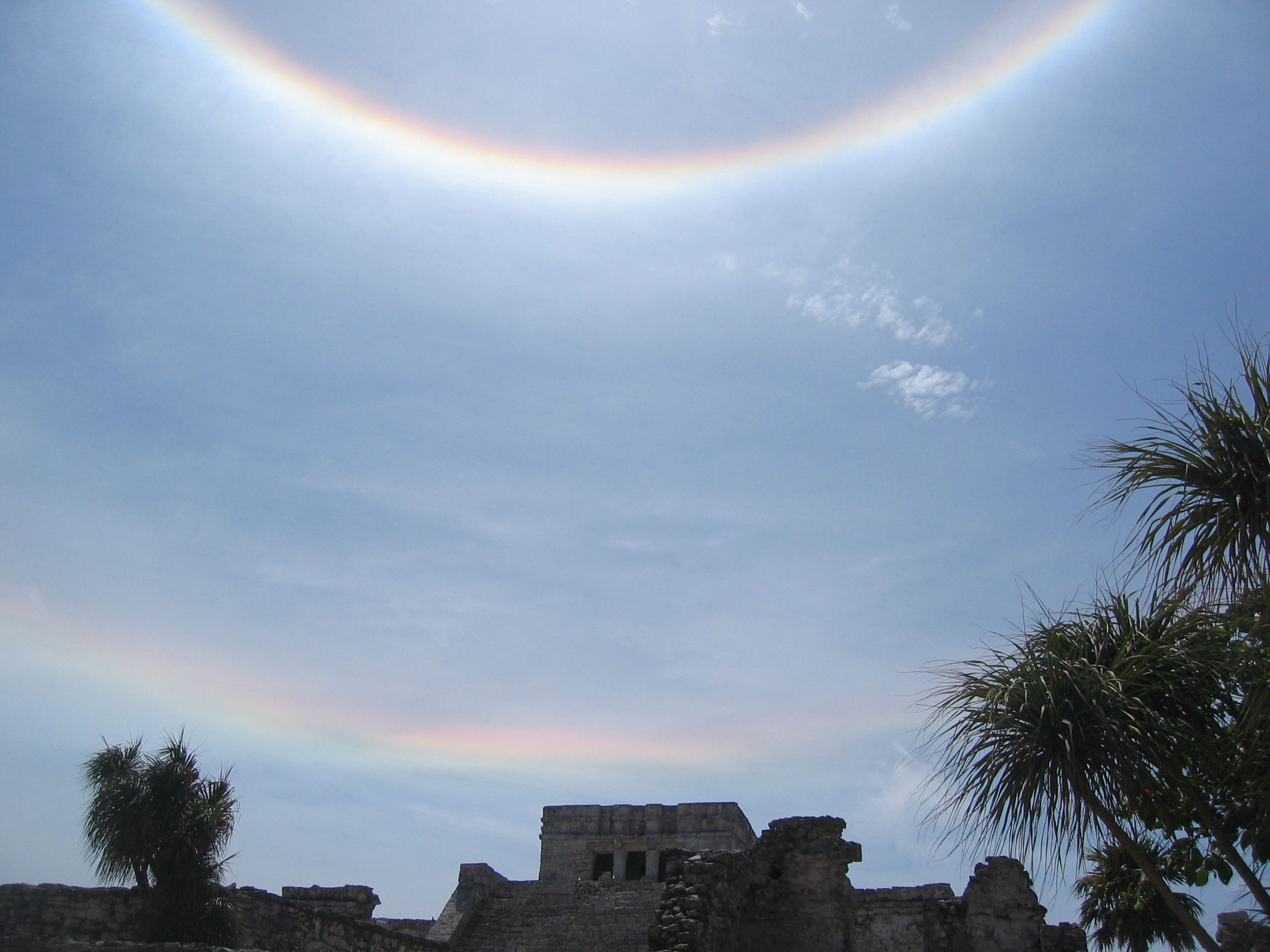
A circumscribed or 22° halo (top) together with a circumhorizon arc (bottom), photographed in Mexico

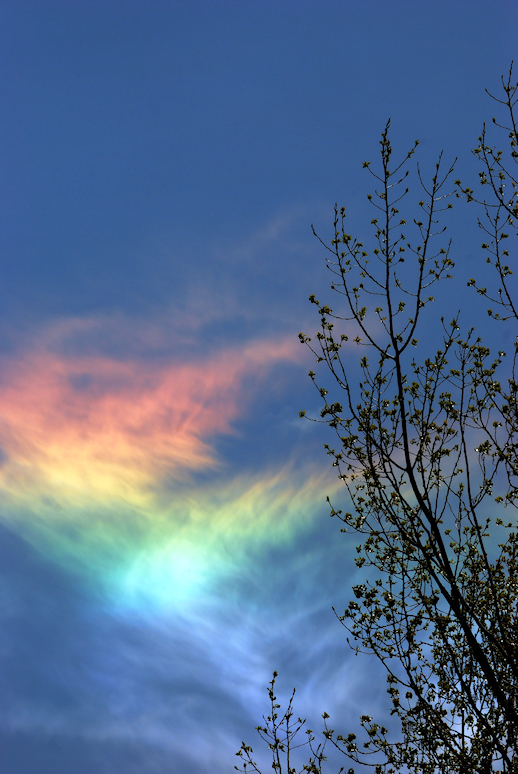
Photographed in Ravenna, Michigan

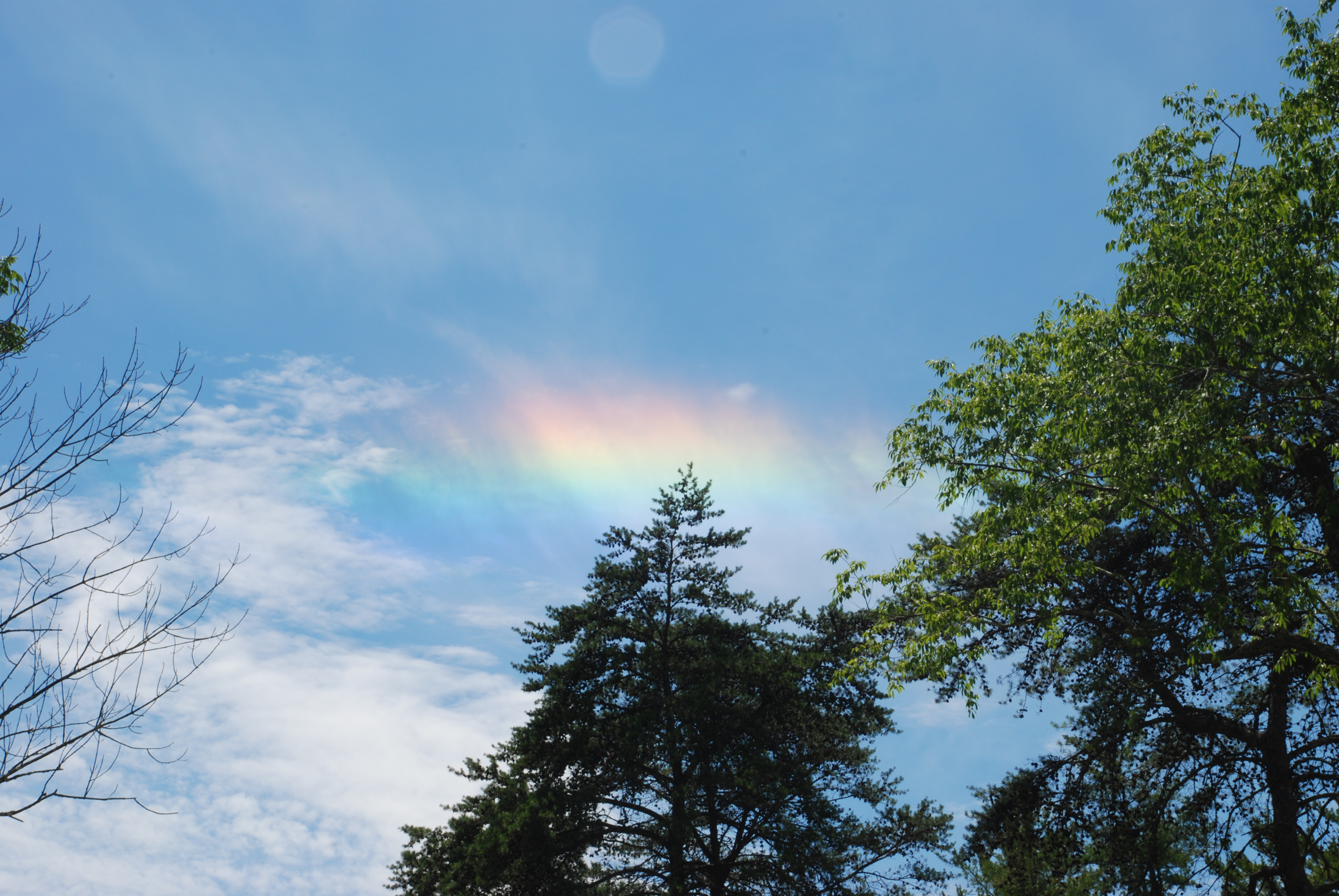
Photographed in Hocking Hills, Ohio

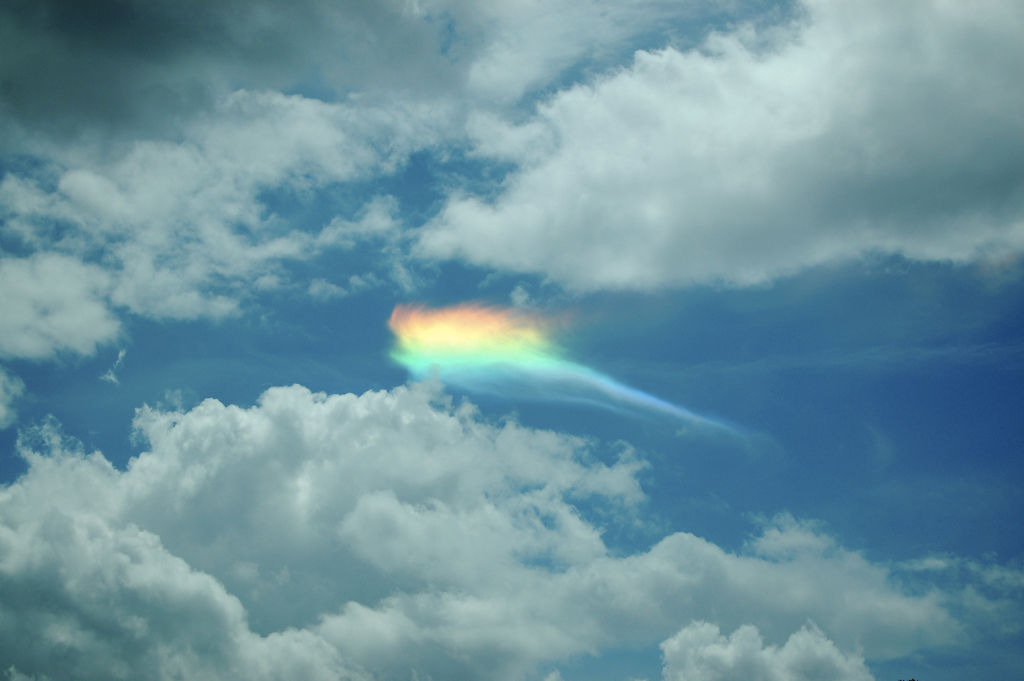
Photographed in Alentejo, Portugal

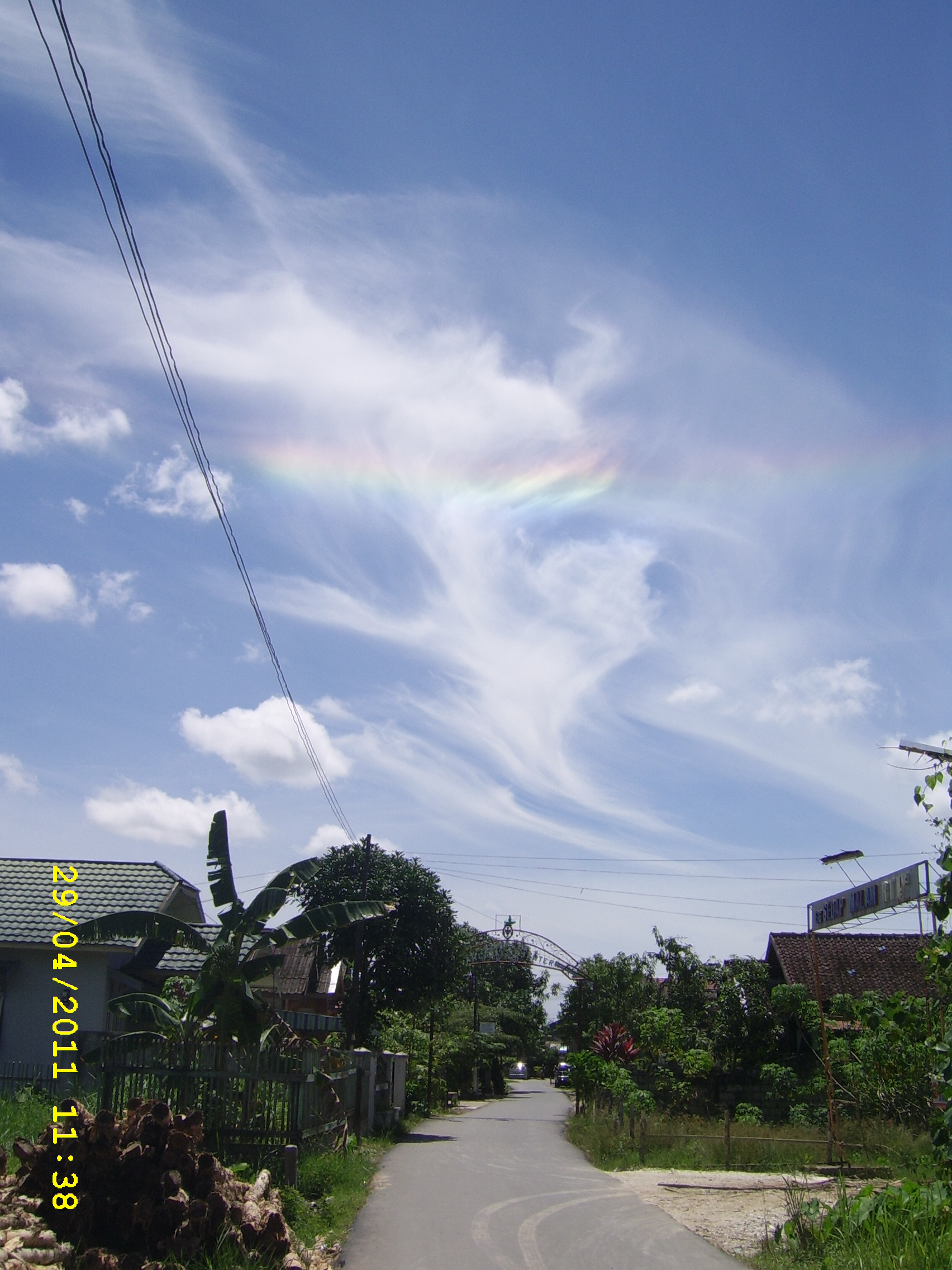
Photographed in Banjarmasin, Indonesia

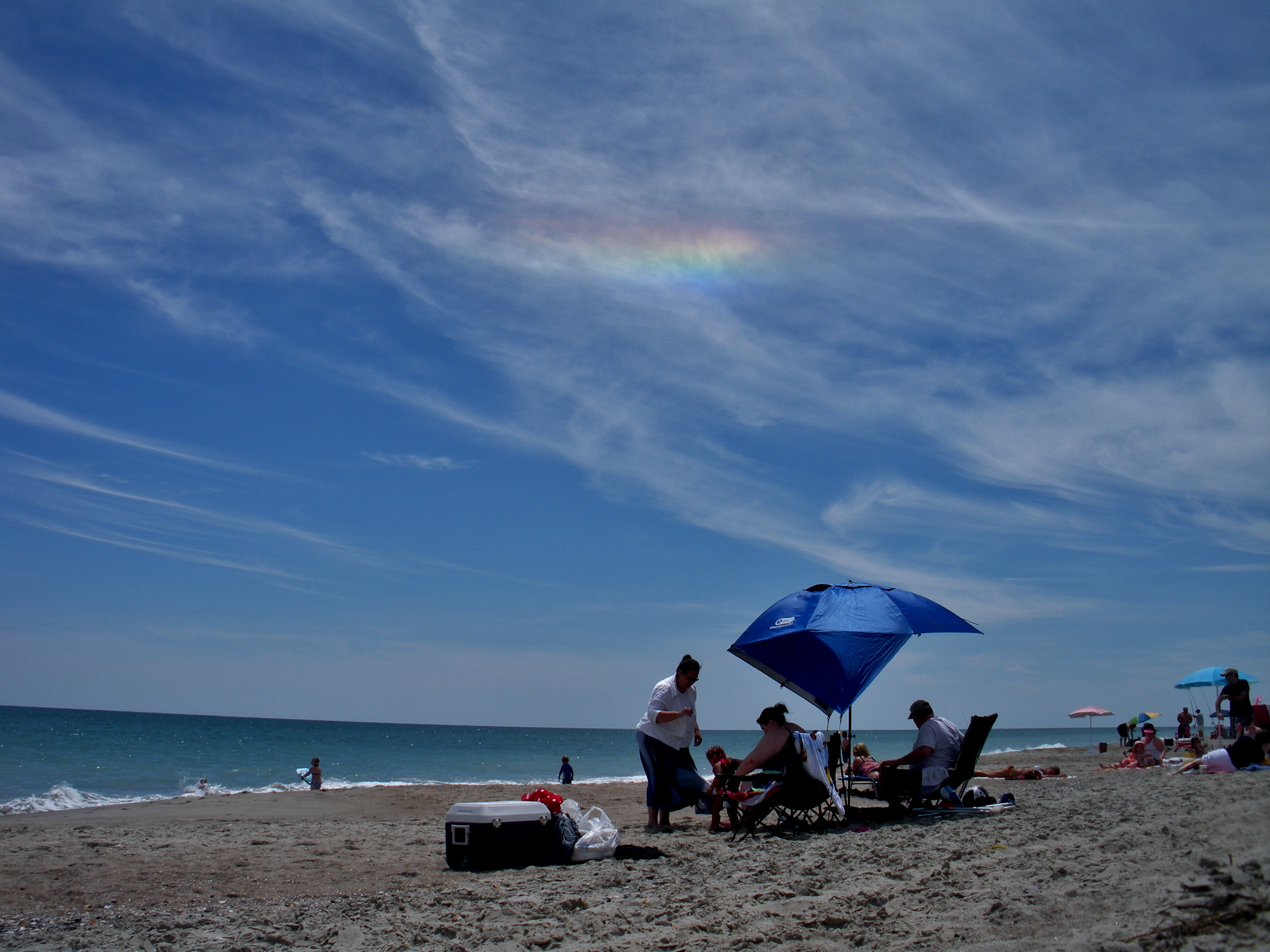
Photographed at Emerald Isle, North Carolina

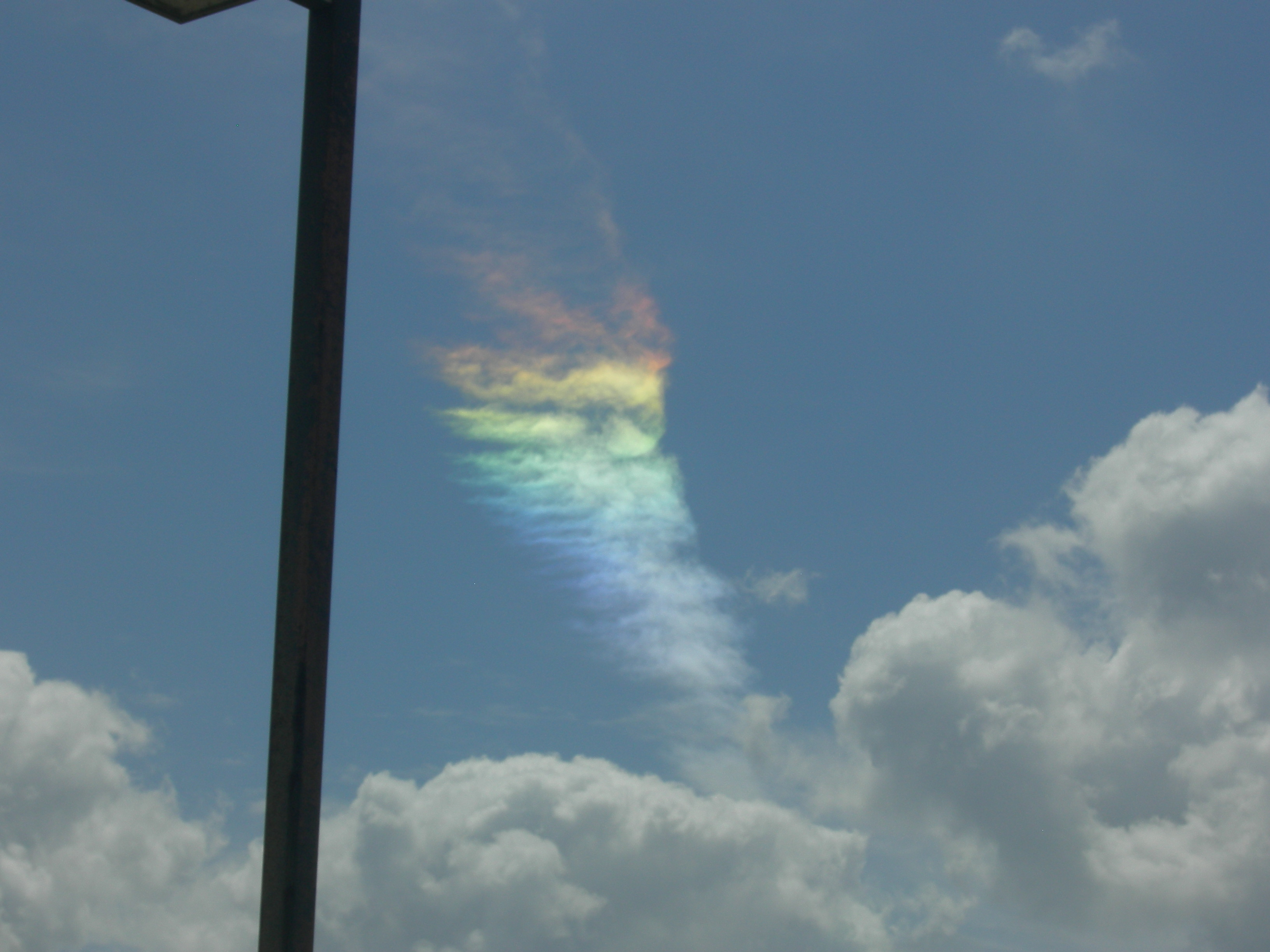
Photographed near Kennedy Space Center, Florida

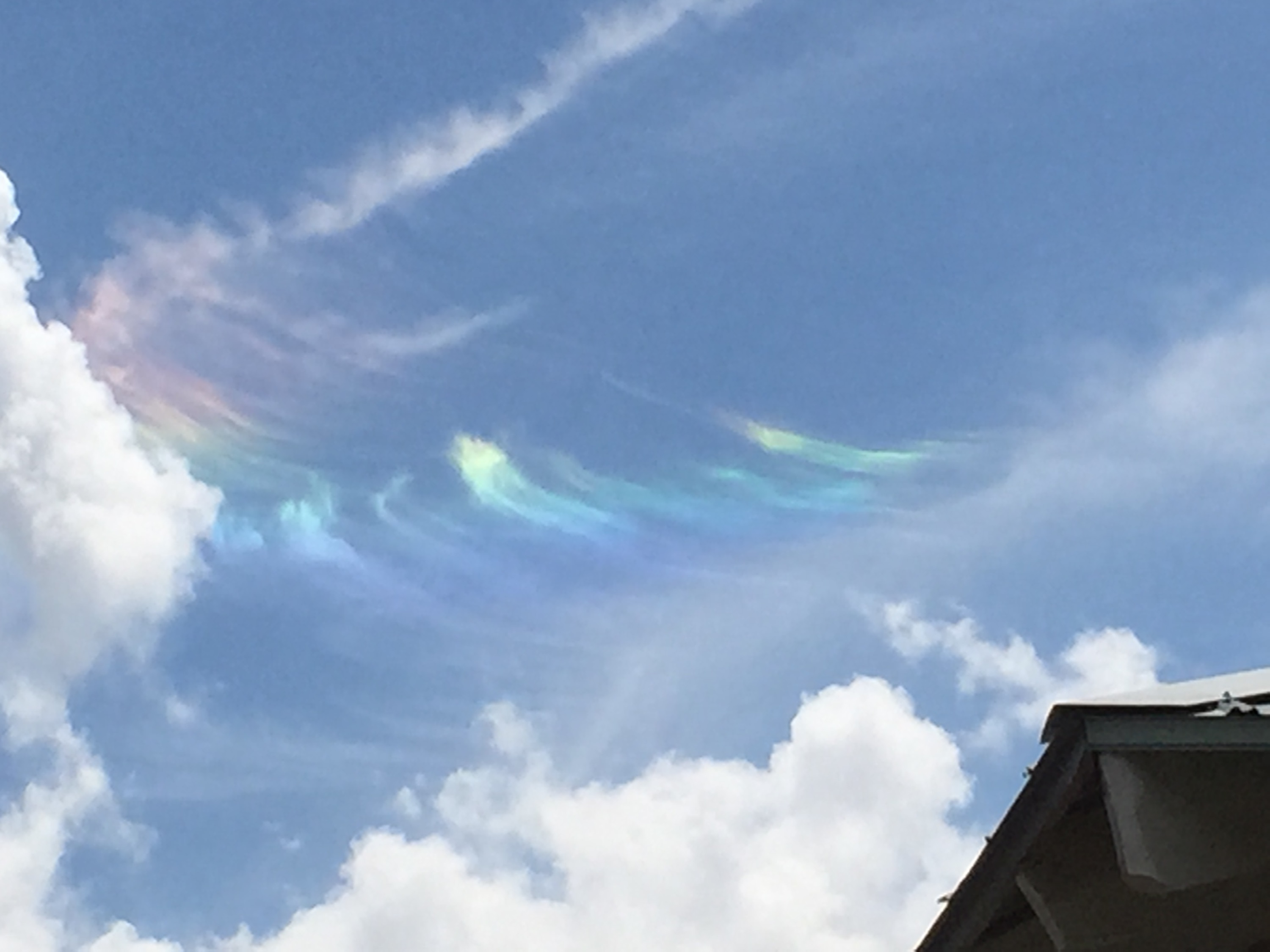
Photographed near Lewisville, Texas

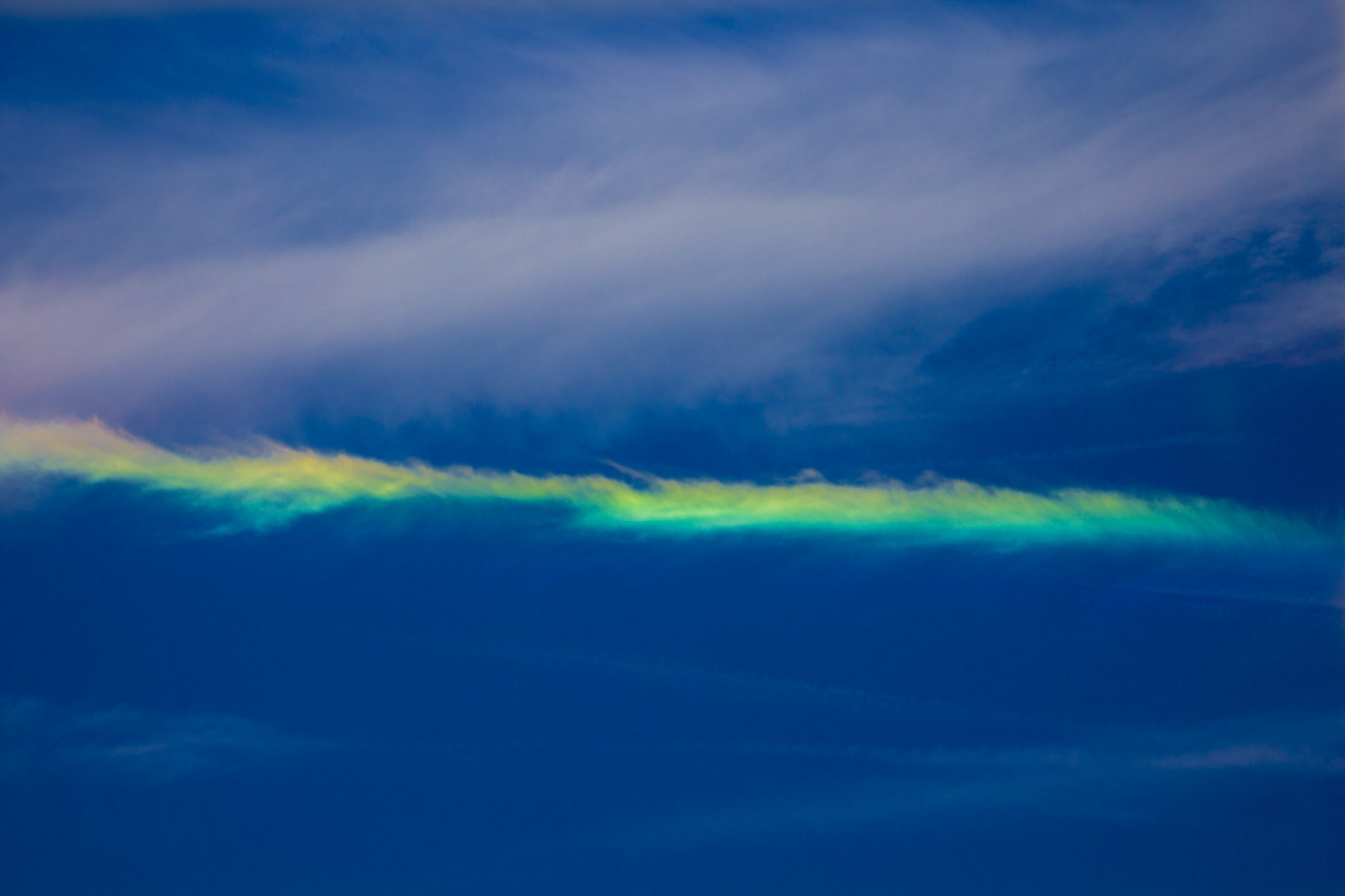
Photographed in Wrightsville, Pennsylvania.

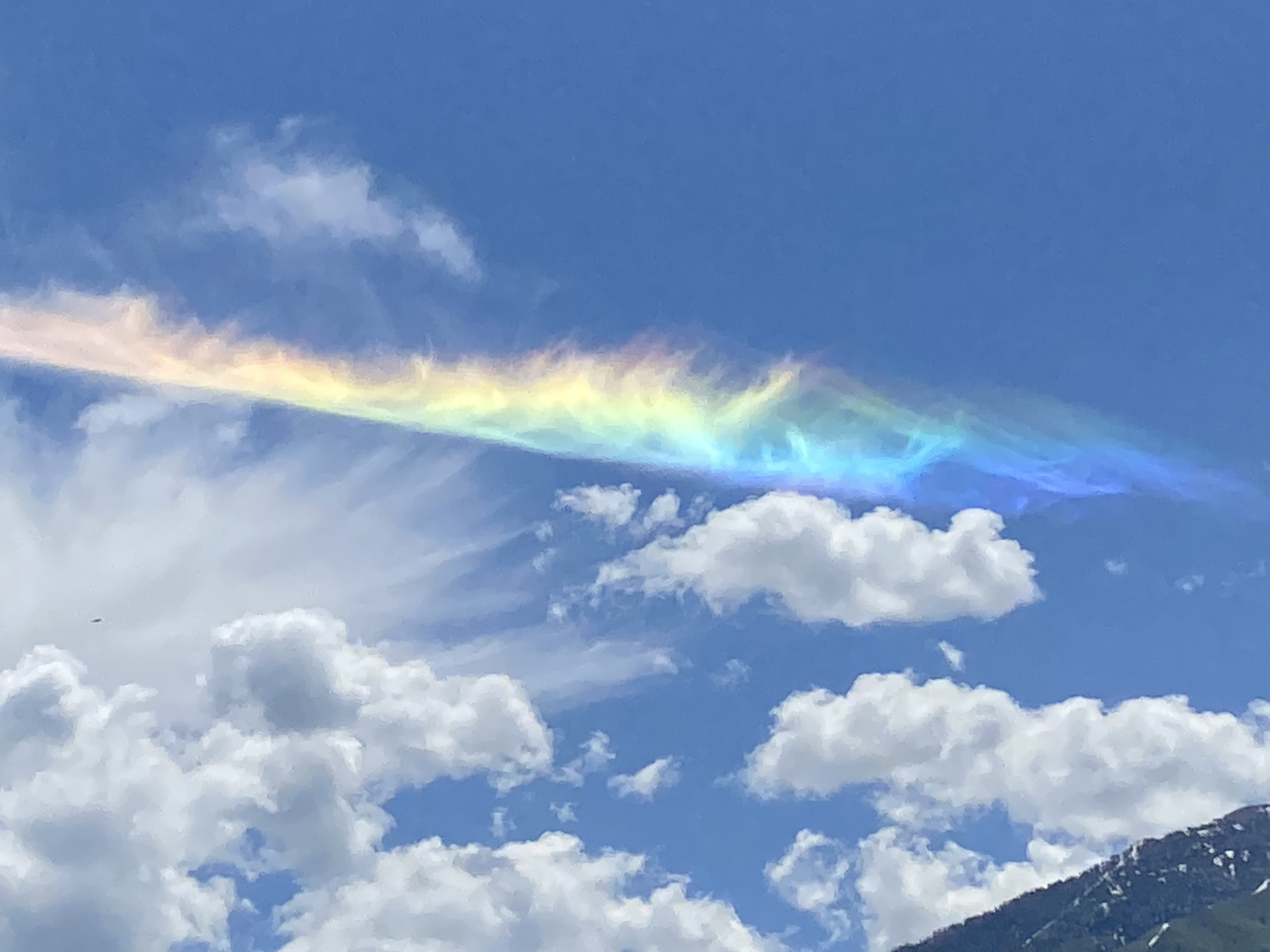
Photographed near Elk Ridge, Utah

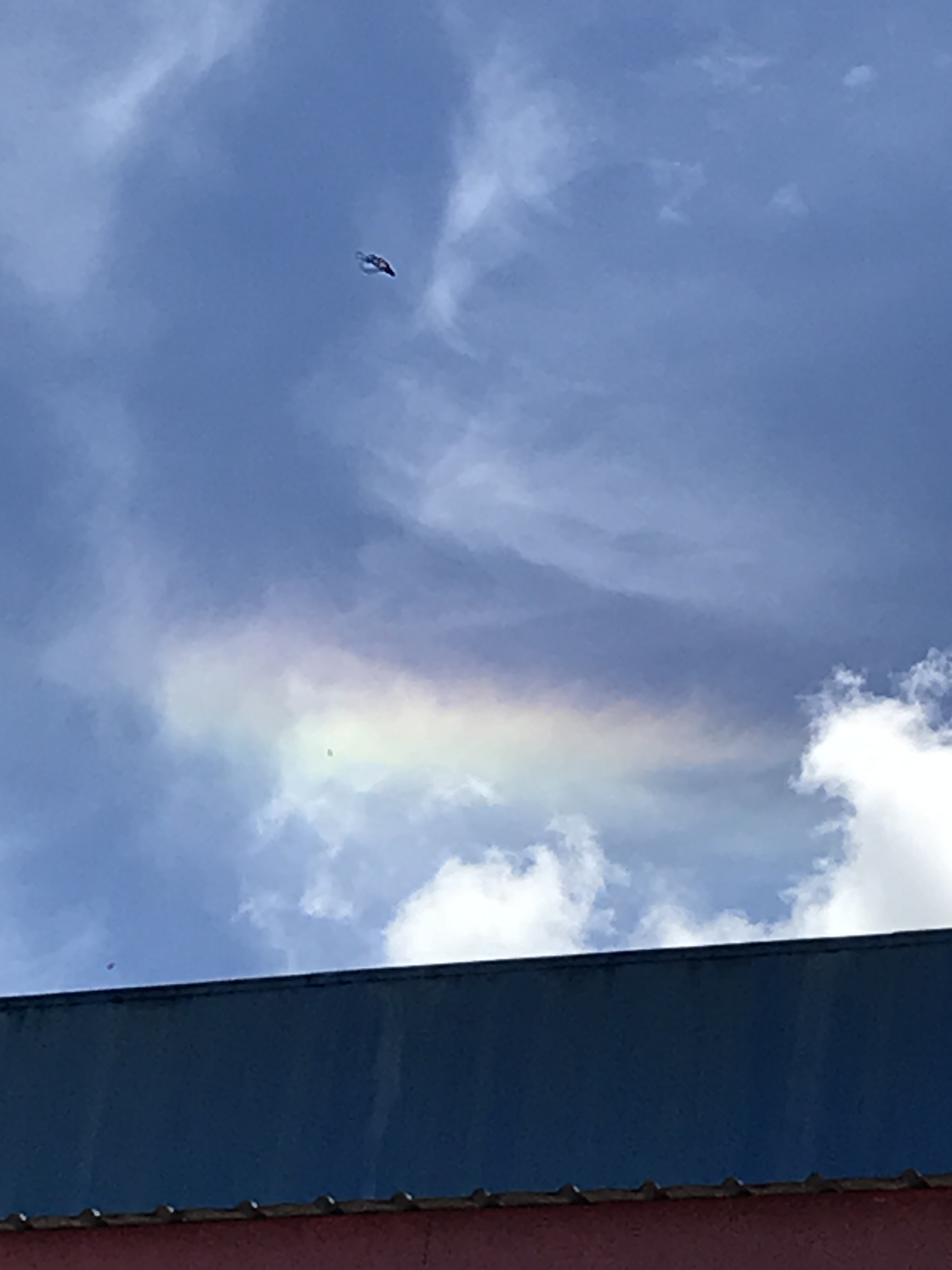
Photographed in Silang, Cavite.

== See also ==
- Halo (optical phenomenon)
- Sundogs
- Cloud iridescence
- Circumzenithal arc
- Polar stratospheric cloud
