= Aristocles of Messene =

1st-century AD Greek philosopher

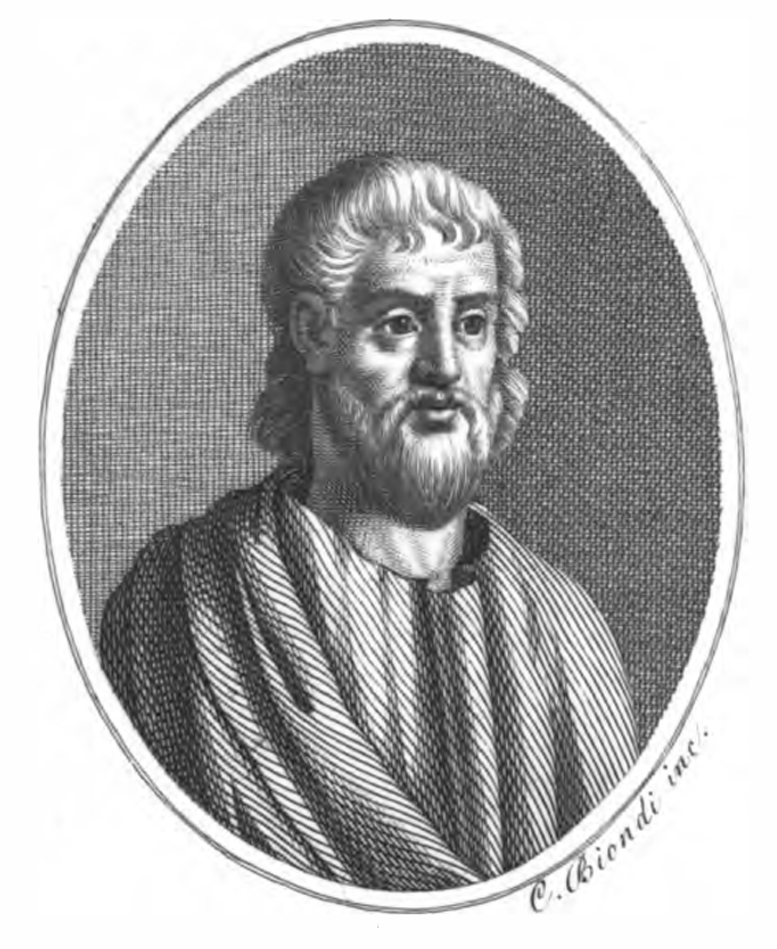
- Born: c. 1st century AD; Messene

Philosophical work
- Era: Ancient Roman philosophy
- School: Peripatetic
- Main interests: Philosophy of history
- Notable works: A history of philosophy, in 10 books
- Notable ideas: Five historical meanings of wisdom

Aristocles of Messene (/əˈrɪstəˌkliːz/; Ancient Greek: Ἀριστοκλῆς ὁ Μεσσήνιος), in Sicily, was a Peripatetic philosopher, who probably lived in the 1st century AD.

== Life ==
Little is known about the life of Aristocles. He came from Messene in Sicily (Messana, now Messina), not from the then far better known city of Messene in the Peloponnese. There are some indications that he stayed in Alexandria. In earlier research he was wrongly considered to be the teacher of the famous Peripatetic Alexander of Aphrodisias. It was erroneously believed that the philosopher Aristotle of Mytilene whom Alexander mentions as his teacher was actually Aristocles and that the name "Aristotle" was a misspelling. This assumption led to a late dating of Aristocles' lifetime (second half of the 2nd century). In more recent research however, it is assumed that he lived around the turn of the millennium. This is supported both by linguistic evidence and by the fact that he refers to the work of the philosopher Aenesidemus, dating to the first half of the 1st century B.C. in a way the suggests that that work had been published recently.

== Works ==
According to the Suda and Eudokia, Aristocles wrote several works:

- Πότερον σπουδαιότερος Ὅμηρος ἢ Πλάτων – Whether Homer or Plato is more Worthy.
- Τέχναι ῥητορικαί – Arts of Rhetoric.
- A work on the god Serapis.
- A work on Ethics, in nine books.
- A work on Philosophy, in ten books.

The last of these works appears to have been a history of philosophy in which he wrote about the philosophers, their schools, and doctrines. Although it has been lost, several fragments of it are preserved in Eusebius' work Praeparatio Evangelica.

== Philosophy ==
Aristocles proves to be a faithful follower of Aristotle, whose teachings he intended to promote. Asclepius of Tralles and John Philoponus, in their commentaries on Nicomachus of Gerasa's Introduction to Arithmetic, reproduce five meanings of the word "wise" that were set out in the treatise On Philosophy. Aristocles connected the five uses of the word with a theory of five levels of human culture. According to this teaching, the survivors of natural disasters (plagues and especially great floods like that of the time of Deucalion) were forced to rediscover inventions such as agriculture because of the lack of food. Such devising was considered "wisdom" at the time. In the second phase of development, they devised arts that were no longer just for survival, but also for aesthetic purposes, such as architecture. Such inventions were then considered a sign of wisdom. In the third epoch, people turned to political affairs and introduced laws and rules that served to organize coexistence in cities. Such was the activity of the seven sages who discovered political science. The fourth epoch brought the understanding of bodies (natural things) and the nature (physis) that produces them; this was called contemplation of nature. Those who deal with it are called sages in the field of natural things (natural philosophy). At the fifth level of culture there was a turning to the divine, transcendental and completely unchangeable beings; knowledge of this realm was called wisdom in the highest sense (metaphysics). The research considers the hypothesis that this philosophy of history put forward by Aristocles, with its concept of gradual progress, is at least partly based on a lost writing by the young Aristotle such as his dialogue "On Philosophy" and his Protrepticus.

Aristocles also opposes criticisms of Aristotle and strives to prove them nonsensical. While he shows great respect for Plato, he polemicized against other philosophical tendencies, whose teachings he cleverly tried to refute with the means of an Aristotelian argument, which makes him a valuable doxographical source on other philosophical doctrines in the history of philosophy, especially Pyrrhonism, with which he deals extensively. However, his descriptions of other philosophical doctrines are sometimes marred by his polemical attitude or a lack of expertise. His account contains information not only about the views of the early Pyrrhonean skeptics, Pyrrho of Elis and Timon of Phlius, but also about later Pyrrhonists including Aenesidemus. He criticizes the tenets of the skeptics and, moreover, tries to show that it is impossible to live consistently according to their principles; through the renunciation of judgments and the resultant abolition of moral concepts, respect for the law is destroyed and the floodgates are wide open to crime. A life according to skeptical principles is contrary to nature; it is impossible for man to have no opinion. Aristocles formulates his arguments polemically, prefers to use rhetorical questions and does not mention important counter-arguments of the skeptics; it is unclear whether he did not know exactly the opponent's position or whether he deliberately withheld counter-arguments.

His confrontation with the views of the Epicureans, about which he was apparently better informed, is on a much higher level. On the one hand he opposes the sensualism and subjective character of experience of the perception based theories of the Epicureans, and on the other hand also against the opposite position, according to which only a cognition of reason that is not dependent on perception deserves trust (Eleatics and, according to Aristocles' understanding, the Megarian school). However, he reproduces the epistemology of the Cyrenaics in a polemically distorted form.
