= Herminus =

2nd century Greek Peripatetic philosopher

Herminus (Greek: Ἑρμῖνος; 2nd century) was a Peripatetic philosopher. He lived in the first half of the 2nd century. He appears to have written commentaries on most of the works of Aristotle. Simplicius says he was the teacher of Alexander of Aphrodisias. We learn from Alexander's commentary on the Prior Analytics that Herminus had worked on Aristotle's syllogistic system, adding innovations which Alexander disapproved of. His writings, of which nothing remains, are frequently referred to by Boethius, who mentions a treatise by him, On Interpretation (Greek: περὶ Ἑρμηνείας), as also Analytics and Topics.

A Stoic philosopher called Herminus is mentioned by Longinus in the preface to his book On Ends. This Herminus had been a teacher when Longinus was young (c. 230).
