= Alexander's band =

Optical phenomenon of the sky

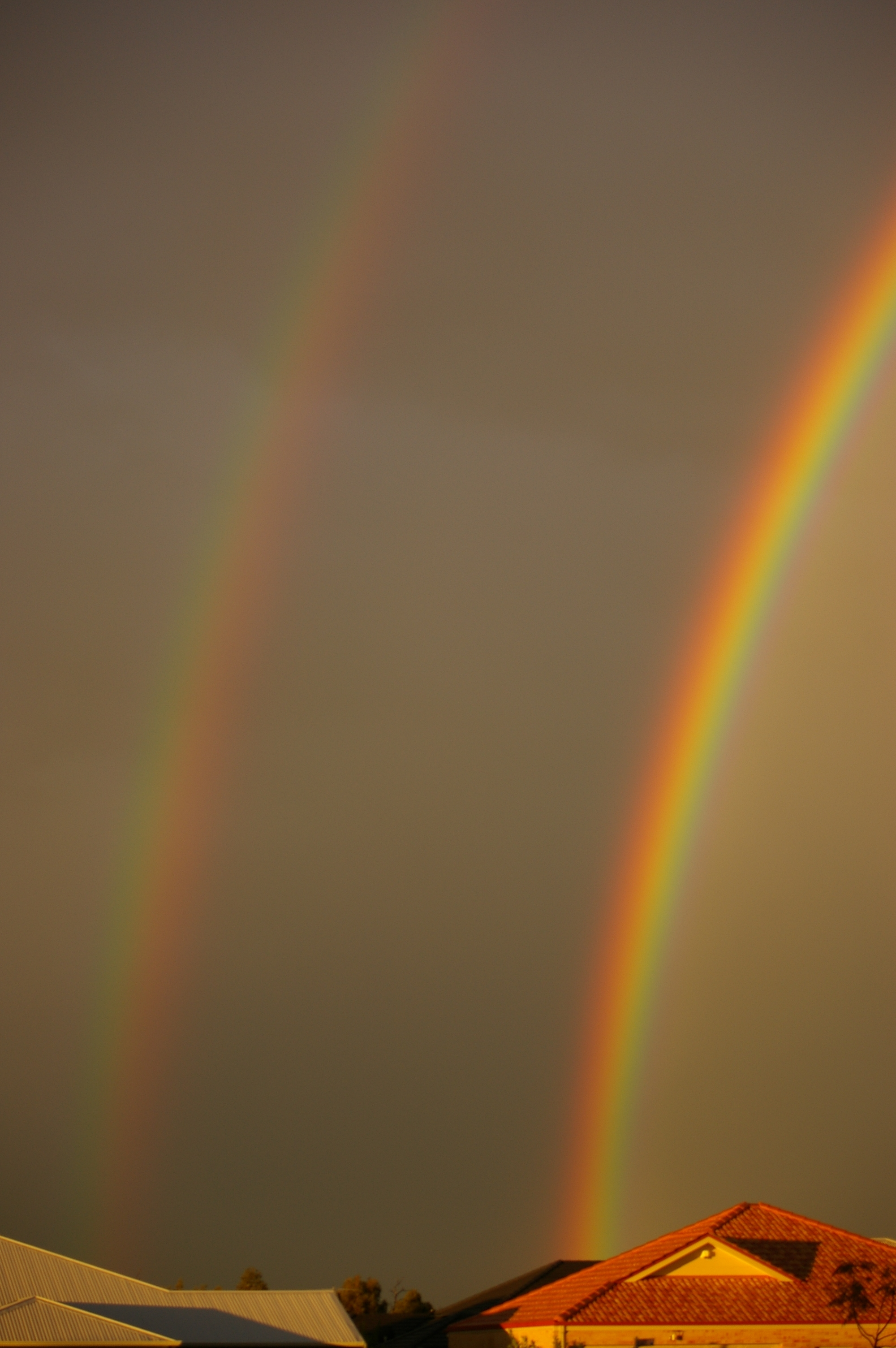
Alexander's band lies between the two rainbows.

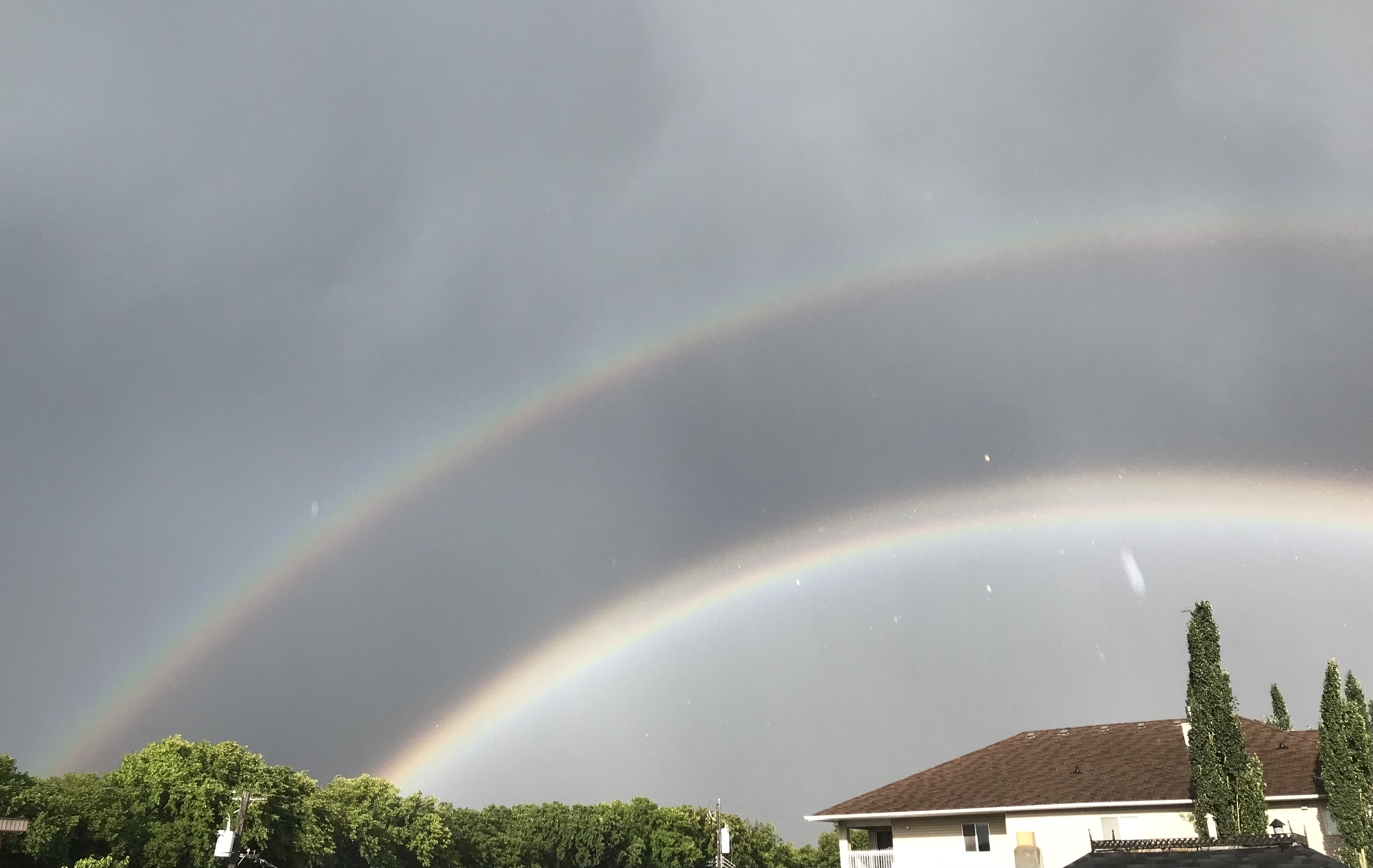
Dark area between rainbows known as Alexander’s band, with a rare twinned primary

A diagram of the phenomenon known as Alexander's band, a dark band that appears between any set of two rainbows which is the result of differing angles of reflection of light through water droplets.

Alexander's band or Alexander's dark band is an optical phenomenon associated with rainbows which was named after Alexander of Aphrodisias who first described this phenomenon in Aphrodisias, Commentary on Book IV of Aristotle's Meteorology (also known as: Commentary on Book IV of Aristotle's De Meteorologica or On Aristotle's Meteorology 4), commentary 41.

The dark band occurs due to the deviation angles of the primary and secondary rainbows. Both bows exist due to an optical effect called the angle of minimum deviation. The refractive index of water prevents light from being deviated at smaller angles. The minimum deviation angle for the primary bow is 137.5°. Light can be deviated up to 180°, causing it to be reflected right back to the observer. Light which is deviated at intermediate angles brightens the inside of the rainbow.

The minimum deviation angle for the secondary bow is about 230°. The fact that this angle is greater than 180° makes the secondary bow an inside-out version of the primary. Its colors are reversed, and light which is deviated at greater angles brightens the sky outside the bow.

Between the two bows lies an area of unlit sky referred to as Alexander's band. Light which is reflected by raindrops in this region of the sky cannot reach the observer, though it may contribute to a rainbow seen by another observer elsewhere.
