= Sosigenes the Peripatetic =

Late 2nd century Roman philosopher and astronomer

Sosigenes the Peripatetic (Ancient Greek: Σωσιγένης) was a philosopher living at the end of the 2nd century AD. He was the tutor of Alexander of Aphrodisias and wrote a work On Revolving Spheres, from which some important extracts have been preserved in Simplicius's commentary on Aristotle's De Caelo.

== Work ==
Sosigenes criticized both Aristotle and Eudoxus for their imperfect theory of celestial spheres and also the use of epicycles, which he felt to be inconsistent with Aristotle's philosophical postulates. He pointed out that the planets varied markedly in brightness, and that solar eclipses are sometimes total and sometimes annular, suggesting that the distances between the Sun, Moon and Earth were not the same at different eclipses.

Sosigenes is perhaps called "the Peripatetic" only because of his connection with Alexander. Some ancient evidence may be taken to suggest that he was, in fact, a Stoic. As John Patrick Lynch has written:

The other two teachers of Alexander may actually have been the philosophers whom ancient sources called Stoics; in both cases, Herminos/Sosigenes "the Stoic" have been distinguished from Herminos/Sosigenes "the Peripatetic" only on the grounds that the two latter men were teachers of Alexander of Aphrodisias. But it is not improbable that Alexander of Aphrodisias studied with two Stoic teachers and that these two pairs of homonymous contemporaries are actually only two Stoic philosophers.

He is often confused with the astronomer Sosigenes of Alexandria, who advised Julius Caesar on the reform of the Roman calendar.
