= Aristotle of Mytilene =

2nd century Greek Peripatetic philosopher

Aristotle of Mytilene (or Aristoteles, Greek: Ἀριστοτέλης ὁ Μυτιληναῖος; fl. 2nd century) was a distinguished Peripatetic philosopher in the time of Galen. It has been argued that he was a teacher of Alexander of Aphrodisias.

Galen (writing c. 190) referred to him as "a leading figure in Peripatetic scholarship." According to Galen, Aristotle of Mytilene never drank cold water because it gave him spasms, but he was attacked with a disease in which it was thought necessary for him to take it. He drank the cold water and died.

It was argued by Paul Moraux in 1967 that Aristotle of Mytilene was a teacher of Alexander of Aphrodisias. Previous scholars had noted that ancient texts refer to an "Aristotle" as a teacher of Alexander of Aphrodisias, and, unaware of any 2nd-century philosophers by that name, had emended the name to "Aristocles". If Moraux's theory is correct, and Aristotle of Mytilene was Alexander's teacher, then his philosophical views are represented in a passage of Alexander's On Intellect dealing with the doctrine of "the external intellect".

This theory, however, was criticised by Pierre Thillet in 1984. Thillet argued that the text that refers to Aristotle as Alexander's teacher might merely mean that Alexander learned from the writings of the famous Aristotle.
