= Alexander of Aphrodisias =

2nd-3rd century Greek peripatetic philosopher

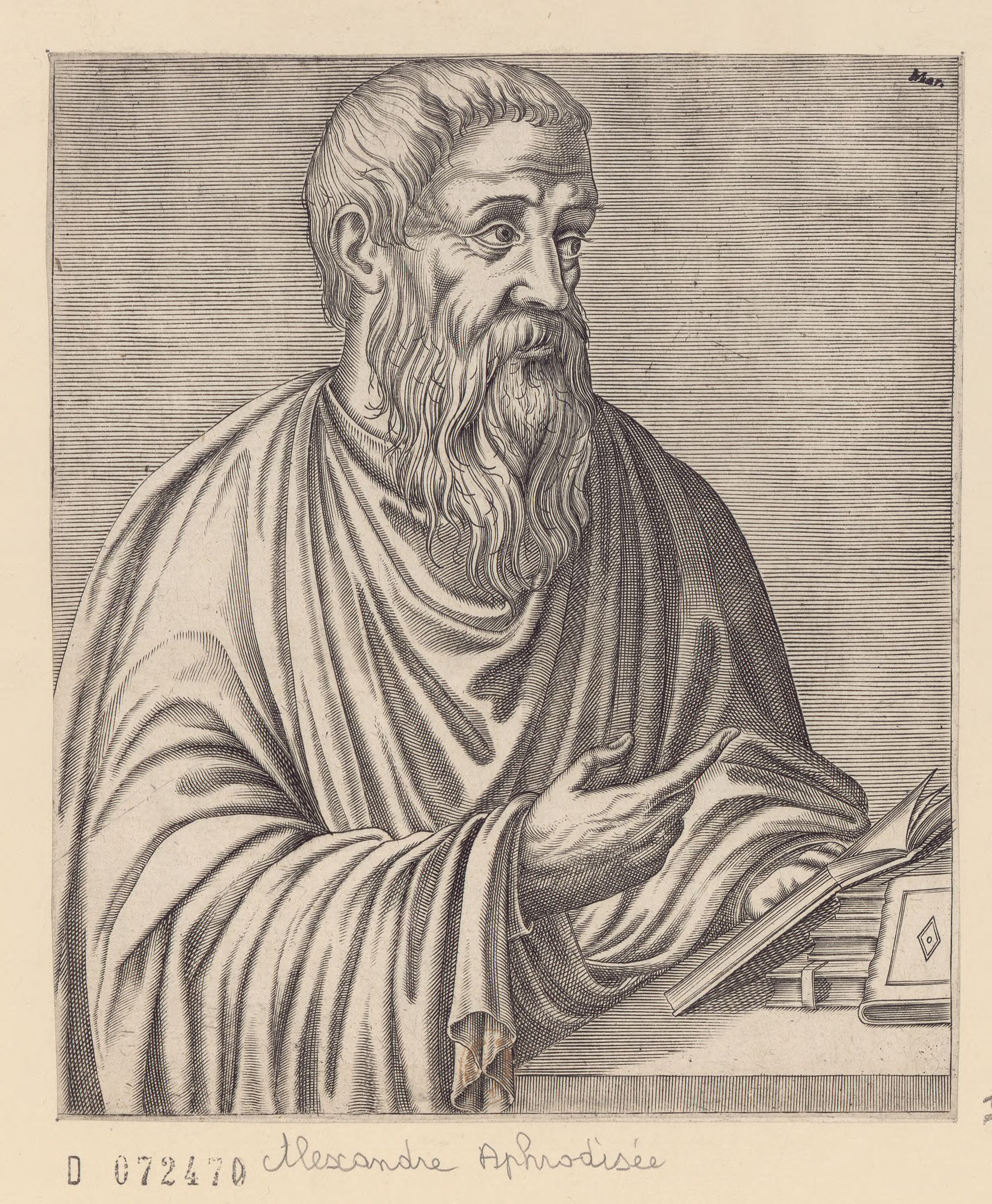
- 16th-century AD engraving
- Born: 2nd century AD; Aphrodisias, Caria (modern-day Geyre, Karacasu, Aydın, Turkey)
- Died: 3rd century AD; Athens

Philosophical work
- School: Peripatetics

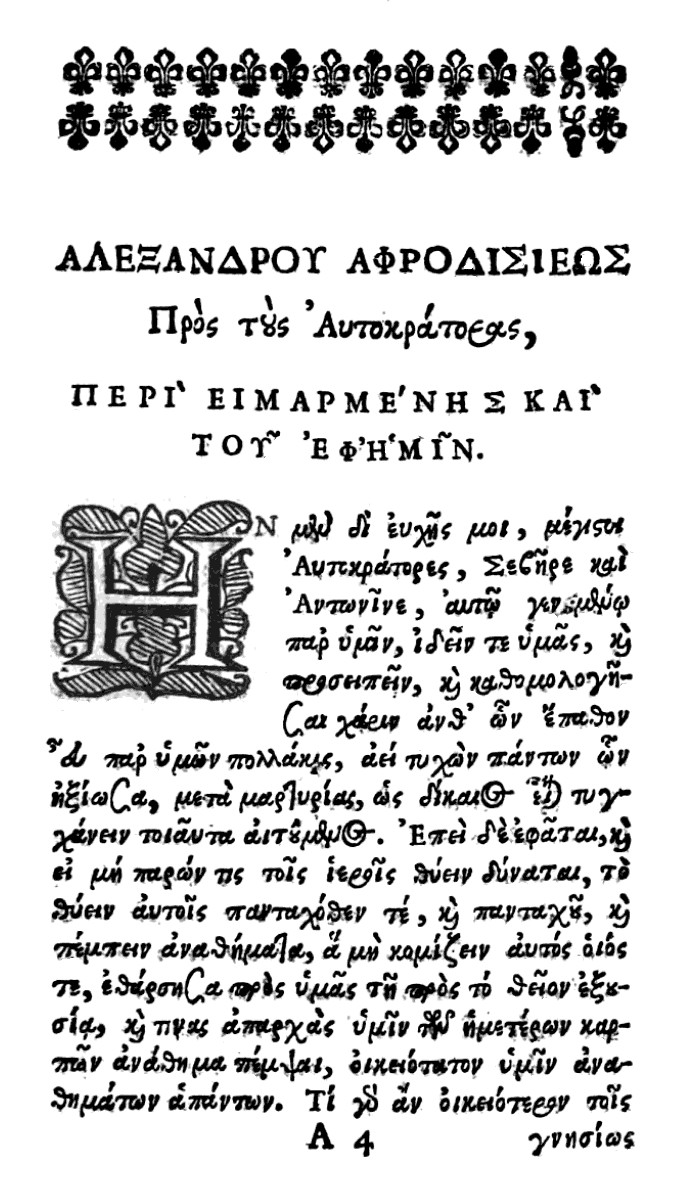
Opening paragraph of the treatise On Fate (Peri eimarmenes) by Alexander of Aphrodisias dedicated to the Emperors (tous autokratoras). From an anonymous edition published in 1658.

Alexander of Aphrodisias (Ancient Greek: Ἀλέξανδρος ὁ Ἀφροδισιεύς, romanized: Alexandros ho Aphrodisieus; fl. 200 AD) was a Peripatetic philosopher and the most celebrated of the Ancient Greek commentators on the writings of Aristotle. He was a native of Aphrodisias in Caria and lived and taught in Athens at the beginning of the 3rd century, where he held a position as head of the Peripatetic school. He wrote many commentaries on the works of Aristotle, extant are those on the Prior Analytics, Topics, Meteorology, Sense and Sensibilia, and Metaphysics. Several original treatises also survive, and include a work On Fate, in which he argues against the Stoic doctrine of necessity; and one On the Soul. His commentaries on Aristotle were considered so useful that he was styled, by way of pre-eminence, "the commentator" (ὁ ἐξηγητής).

== Life and career ==
Alexander was a native of Aphrodisias in Caria (present-day Turkey) and came to Athens towards the end of the 2nd century. He was a student of the two Stoic, or possibly Peripatetic, philosophers Sosigenes and Herminus, and perhaps of Aristotle of Mytilene. At Athens he became head of the Peripatetic school and lectured on Peripatetic philosophy. Alexander's dedication of On Fate to Septimius Severus and Caracalla, in gratitude for his position at Athens, indicates a date between 198 and 209. A recently published inscription from Aphrodisias confirms that he was head of one of the Schools at Athens and gives his full name as Titus Aurelius Alexander. His full nomenclature shows that his grandfather or other ancestor was probably given Roman citizenship by the emperor Antoninus Pius, while proconsul of Asia. The inscription honours his father, also called Alexander and also a philosopher. This fact makes it plausible that some of the suspect works that form part of Alexander's corpus should be ascribed to his father.

=== Commentaries ===
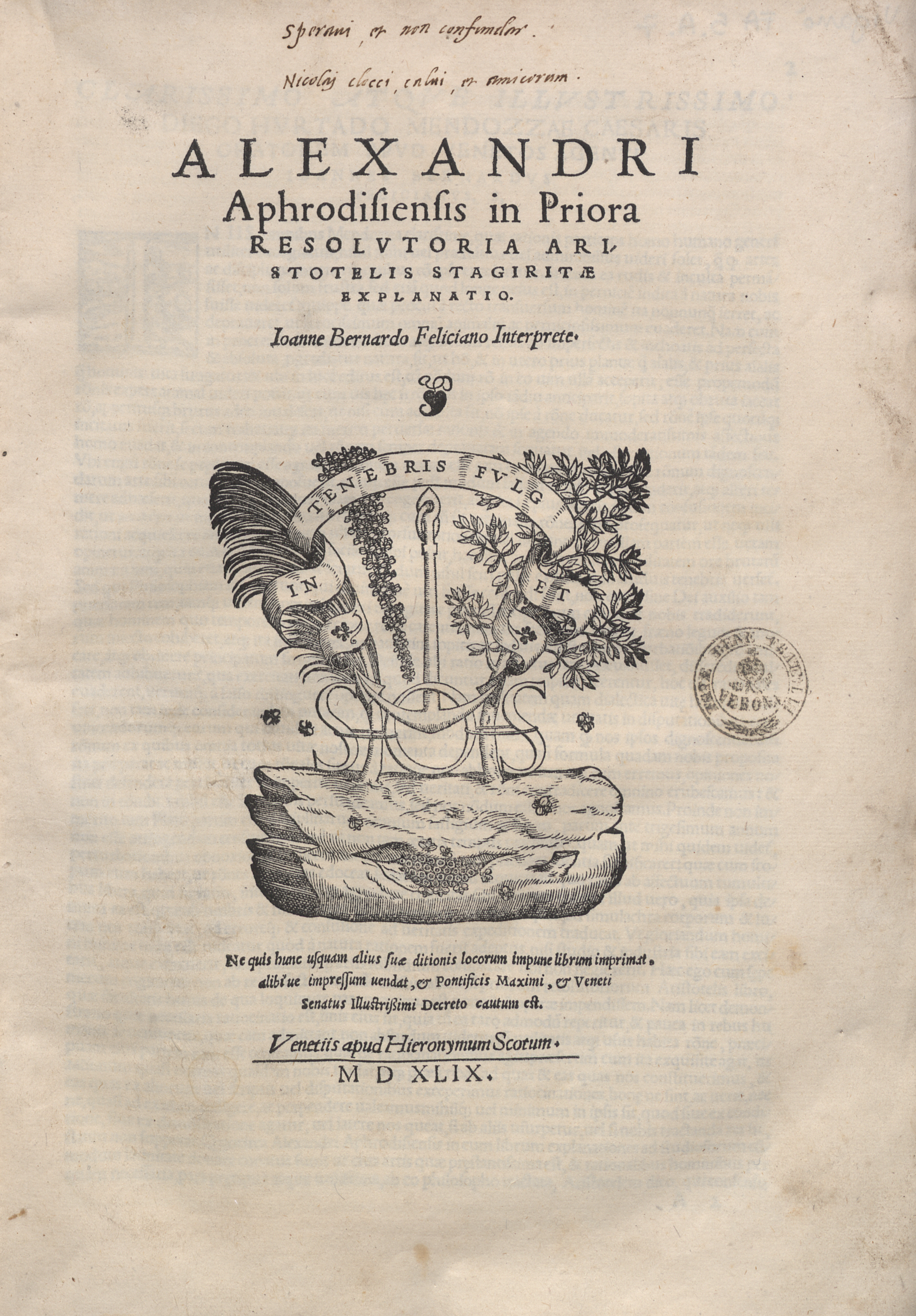
Commentaria in Analytica priora Aristotelis, 1549

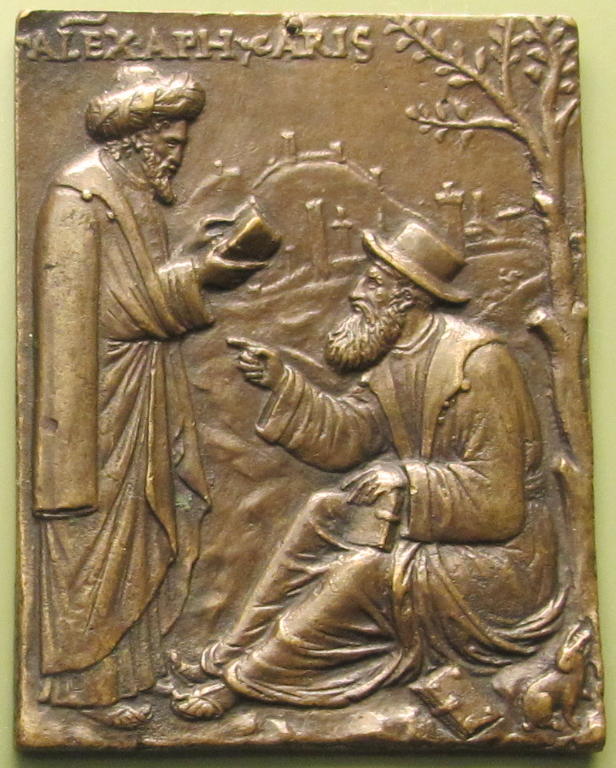
Andrea Briosco, Aristotle and Alexander of Aphrodisias, 16th century plaquette, Bode-Museum

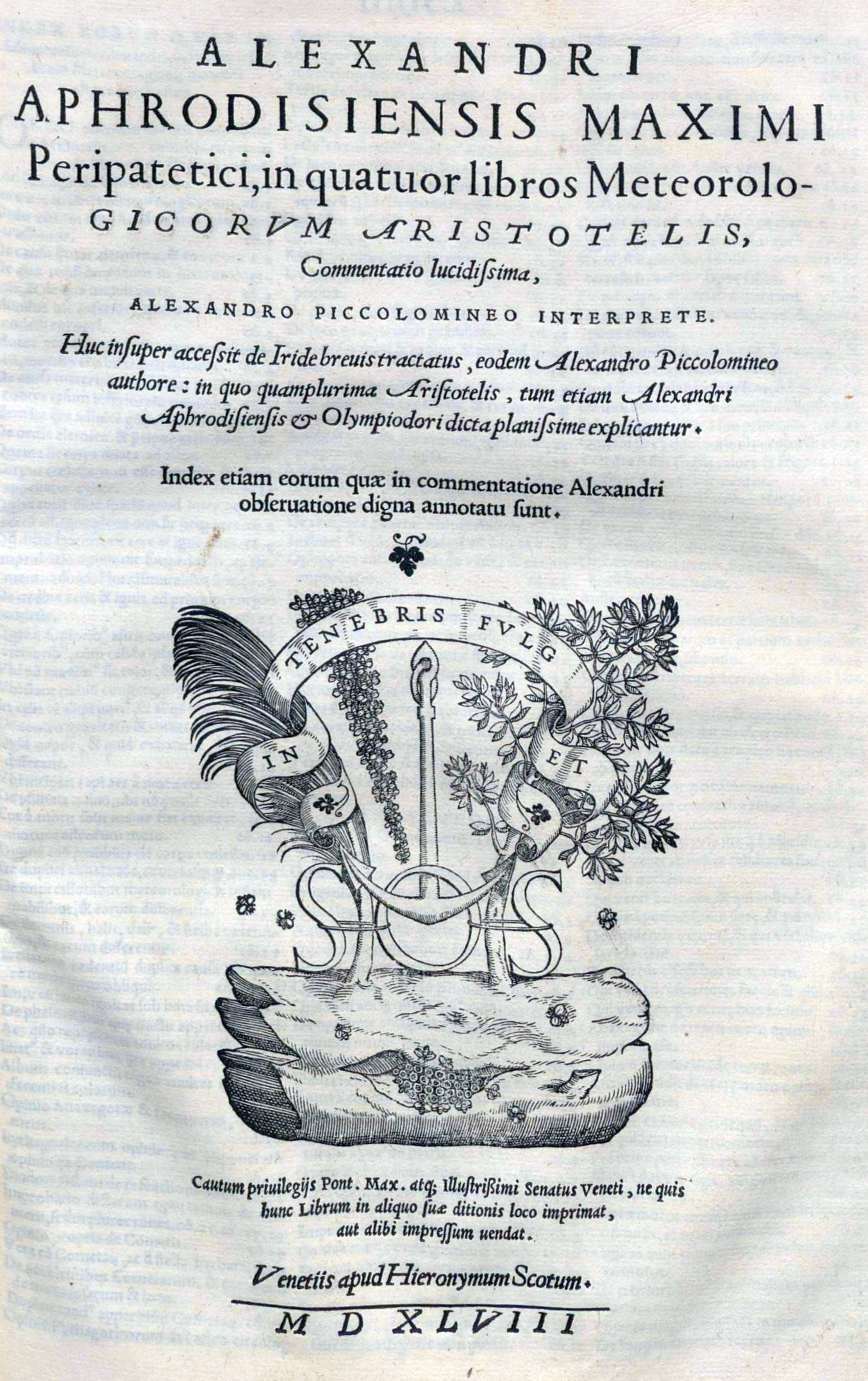
Commentaria in meteorologica Aristotelis, 1548

Alexander composed several commentaries on the works of Aristotle, in which he sought to escape a syncretistic tendency and to recover the pure doctrines of Aristotle. His extant commentaries are on Prior Analytics (Book 1), Topics, Meteorology, Sense and Sensibilia, and Metaphysics (Books 1–5). The commentary on the Sophistical Refutations is deemed spurious, as is the commentary on the final nine books of the Metaphysics. The lost commentaries include works on the De Interpretatione, Posterior Analytics, Physics, On the Heavens, On Generation and Corruption, On the Soul, and On Memory. Simplicius of Cilicia mentions that Alexander provided commentary on the quadrature of the lunes, and the corresponding problem of squaring the circle. In April 2007, it was reported that imaging analysis had discovered an early commentary on Aristotle's Categories in the Archimedes Palimpsest, and Robert Sharples suggested Alexander as the most likely author.

=== Original treatises ===
There are also several extant original writings by Alexander. These include: On the Soul, Problems and Solutions, Ethical Problems, On Fate, and On Mixture and Growth. Three works attributed to him are considered spurious: Medical Questions, Physical Problems, and On Fevers. Additional works by Alexander are preserved in Arabic translation, these include: On the Principles of the Universe, On Providence, and Against Galen on Motion.

On the Soul (De anima) is a treatise on the soul written along the lines suggested by Aristotle in his own De anima. Alexander contends that the undeveloped reason in man is material (nous hylikos) and inseparable from the body. He argued strongly against the doctrine of the soul's immortality. He identified the active intellect (nous poietikos), through whose agency the potential intellect in man becomes actual, with God. A second book is known as the Supplement to On the Soul (Mantissa). The Mantissa is a series of twenty-five separate pieces of which the opening five deal directly with psychology. The remaining twenty pieces cover problems in physics and ethics, of which the largest group deals with questions of vision and light, and the final four with fate and providence. The Mantissa was probably not written by Alexander in its current form, but much of the actual material may be his.

Problems and Solutions (Quaestiones) consists of three books which, although termed "problems and solutions of physical questions," treat of subjects which are not all physical, and are not all problems. Among the sixty-nine items in these three books, twenty-four deal with physics, seventeen with psychology, eleven with logic and metaphysics, and six with questions of fate and providence. It is unlikely that Alexander wrote all of the Quaestiones, some may be Alexander's own explanations, while others may be exercises by his students.

Ethical Problems was traditionally counted as the fourth book of the Quaestiones. The work is a discussion of ethical issues based on Aristotle, and contains responses to questions and problems deriving from Alexander's school. It is likely that the work was not written by Alexander himself, but rather by his pupils on the basis of debates involving Alexander.

On Fate is a treatise in which Alexander argues against the Stoic doctrine of necessity. In On Fate Alexander denied three things - necessity (ἀνάγκη), the foreknowledge of fated events that was part of the Stoic identification of God and Nature, and determinism in the sense of a sequence of causes that was laid down beforehand (προκαταβεβλημένα αἴτια) or predetermined by antecedents (προηγούμενα αἴτια). He defended a view of moral responsibility we would call libertarianism today.

On Mixture and Growth discusses the topic of mixture of physical bodies. It is both an extended discussion (and polemic) on Stoic physics, and an exposition of Aristotelian thought on this theme.

On the Principles of the Universe is preserved in Arabic translation. This treatise is not mentioned in surviving Greek sources, but it enjoyed great popularity in the Muslim world, and a large number of copies have survived. The main purpose of this work is to give a general account of Aristotelian cosmology and metaphysics, but it also has a polemical tone, and it may be directed at rival views within the Peripatetic school. Alexander was concerned with filling the gaps of the Aristotelian system and smoothing out its inconsistencies, while also presenting a unified picture of the world, both physical and ethical. The topics dealt with are the nature of the heavenly motions and the relationship between the unchangeable celestial realm and the sublunar world of generation and decay. His principal sources are the Physics (book 7), Metaphysics (book 12), and the Pseudo-Aristotelian On the Universe.

On Providence survives in two Arabic versions. In this treatise, Alexander opposes the Stoic view that divine Providence extends to all aspects of the world; he regards this idea as unworthy of the gods. Instead, providence is a power that emanates from the heavens to the sublunar region, and is responsible for the generation and destruction of earthly things, without any direct involvement in the lives of individuals.

== Influence ==
By the 6th century Alexander's commentaries on Aristotle were considered so useful that he was referred to as "the commentator" (ὁ ἐξηγητής). His commentaries were greatly esteemed among the Arabs, who translated many of them, and he is heavily quoted by Maimonides.

In 1210, the Church Council of Paris issued a condemnation, which probably targeted the writings of Alexander among others.

In the early Renaissance his doctrine of the soul's mortality was adopted by Pietro Pomponazzi (against the Thomists and the Averroists), and by his successor Cesare Cremonini. This school is known as Alexandrists.

Alexander's band, an optical phenomenon, is named after him.

== Modern editions ==
Several of Alexander's works were published in the Aldine edition of Aristotle, Venice, 1495–1498; his De Fato and De Anima were printed along with the works of Themistius at Venice (1534); the former work, which has been translated into Latin by Grotius and also by Schulthess, was edited by J. C. Orelli, Zürich, 1824; and his commentaries on the Metaphysica by H. Bonitz, Berlin, 1847. In 1989 the first part of his On Aristotle's Metaphysics was published in English translation as part of the Ancient commentators project. Since then, other works of his have been translated into English.

== Bibliography ==
=== Translations ===
- M. Bergeron, Dufour (trans., comm.), 2009. De l’Âme. Textes & Commentaires. . Paris: Librairie Philosophique J. Vrin, 2008. 416 p. ISBN 2-7116-1973-7
- R. W. Sharples, 1990, Alexander of Aphrodisias: Ethical Problems. Duckworth. ISBN 0-7156-2241-2
- W. E. Dooley, 1989, Alexander of Aphrodisias: On Aristotle Metaphysics 1. Duckworth. ISBN 0-7156-2243-9
- W. E. Dooley, A. Madigan, 1992, Alexander of Aphrodisias: On Aristotle Metaphysics 2-3. Duckworth. ISBN 0-7156-2373-7
- A. Madigan, 1993, Alexander of Aphrodisias: On Aristotle Metaphysics 4. Duckworth. ISBN 0-7156-2482-2
- W. Dooley, 1993, Alexander of Aphrodisias: On Aristotle Metaphysics 5. Duckworth. ISBN 0-7156-2483-0
- E. Lewis, 1996, Alexander of Aphrodisias: On Aristotle Meteorology 4. Duckworth. ISBN 0-7156-2684-1
- E. Gannagé, 2005, Alexander of Aphrodisias: On Aristotle On Coming-to-Be and Perishing 2.2-5. Duckworth. ISBN 0-7156-3303-1
- A. Towey, 2000, Alexander of Aphrodisias: On Aristotle On Sense Perception. Duckworth. ISBN 0-7156-2899-2
- V. Caston, 2011, Alexander of Aphrodisias: On Aristotle On the Soul. Duckworth. ISBN 0-7156-3923-4
- J. Barnes, S. Bobzien, K. Flannery, K. Ierodiakonou, 1991, Alexander of Aphrodisias: On Aristotle Prior Analytics 1.1-7. Duckworth. ISBN 0-7156-2347-8
- I. Mueller, J. Gould, 1999, Alexander of Aphrodisias: On Aristotle Prior Analytics 1.8-13. Duckworth. ISBN 0-7156-2855-0
- I. Mueller, J. Gould, 1999, Alexander of Aphrodisias: On Aristotle Prior Analytics 1.14-22. Duckworth. ISBN 0-7156-2876-3
- I. Mueller, 2006, Alexander of Aphrodisias: On Aristotle Prior Analytics 1.23-31. Duckworth. ISBN 0-7156-3407-0
- I. Mueller, 2006, Alexander of Aphrodisias: On Aristotle Prior Analytics 1.32-46. Duckworth. ISBN 0-7156-3408-9
- J. M. Van Ophuijsen, 2000, Alexander of Aphrodisias: On Aristotle Topics 1. Duckworth. ISBN 0-7156-2853-4
- R. W. Sharples, 1983, Alexander of Aphrodisias: On Fate. Duckworth. ISBN 0-7156-1739-7
- R. W. Sharples, 1992, Alexander of Aphrodisias: Quaestiones 1.1-2.15. Duckworth. ISBN 0-7156-2372-9
- R. W. Sharples, 1994, Alexander of Aphrodisias: Quaestiones 2.16-3.15. Duckworth. ISBN 0-7156-2615-9
- R. W. Sharples, 2004, Alexander of Aphrodisias: Supplement to On the Soul. Duckworth. ISBN 0-7156-3236-1
- Charles Genequand, 2001, Alexander of Aphrodisias: On the Cosmos. Brill. ISBN 90-04-11963-9

== See also ==
- Alexander's band - an optical phenomenon associated with rainbows
- Free will in antiquity
