= Aureole effect =

Optical phenomenon in water

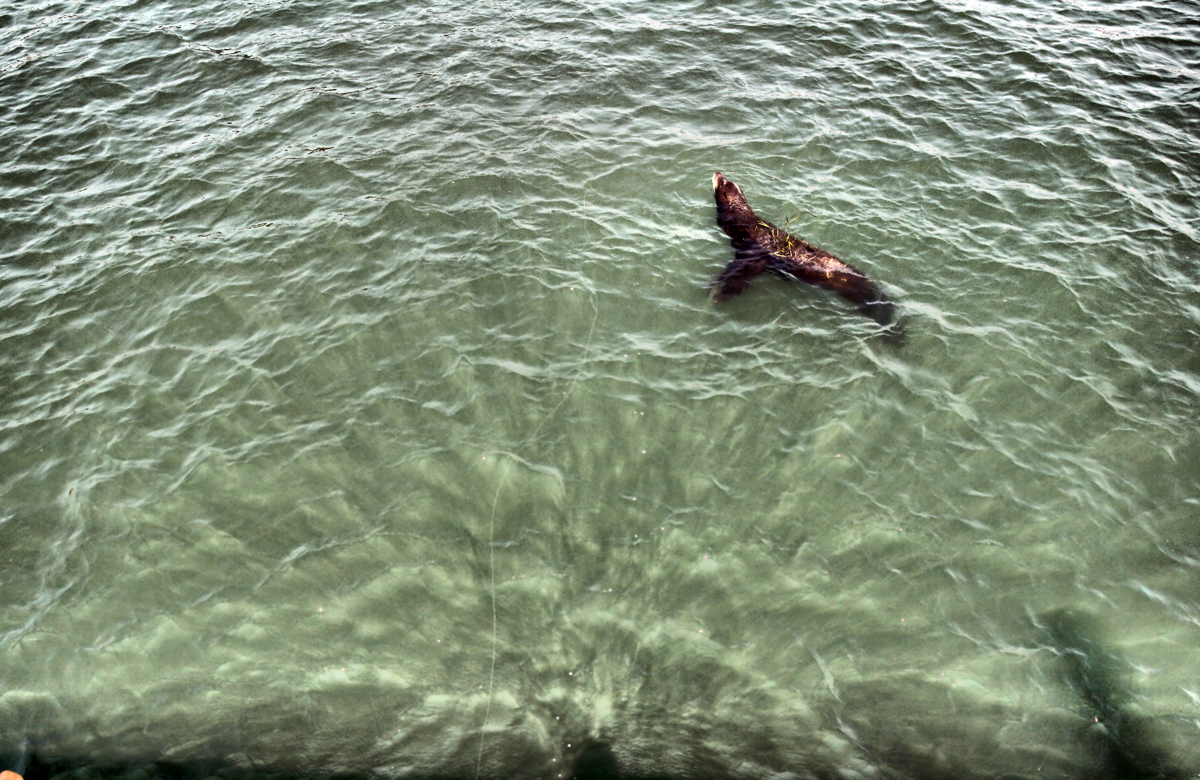
An aureole effect radiating from the photographer's shadow (bottom center). A California sea lion swims by in the background.

The aureole effect or water aureole is an optical phenomenon similar to Heiligenschein, creating sparkling light and dark rays radiating from the shadow of the viewer's head. This effect is seen only over a rippling water surface. The waves act as lenses to focus and defocus sunlight: focused sunlight produces the lighter rays, while defocused sunlight produces the darker rays. Suspended particles in the water help make the aureole effect more pronounced. The effect extends a greater angular distance from the viewer's shadow when the viewer is higher above the water, and can sometimes be seen from a plane.

Although the focused (light) ray cones are actually more or less parallel to each other, the rays from the aureole effect appear to be radiating from the shadow of the viewer’s head due to perspective effects. The viewer's line of sight is parallel and lies within the cones, so from the viewer's perspective the rays seem to be radiating from the antisolar point, within the viewer's shadow.

As in similar antisolar optical effects (such as a glory or Heiligenschein), each observer will see an aureole effect radiating only from their own head’s shadow. Similarly, if a photographer holds their camera at arm's length, the aureole effect appearing in the picture will be seen radiating from the shadow of the camera, although the photographer would still see it around their head's shadow while taking the picture. This happens because the aureole effect always appears directly opposite the sun, centered at the antisolar point. The antisolar point itself is located within the shadow of the viewer, whatever this is: the eyes of the viewer or the camera's lens. As a matter of fact, when aureole effects are photographed from a plane, it is possible to tell where the photographer was seated.

== See also ==
- Gegenschein
- Retroreflection
- Subparhelic circle
- Sylvanshine
