= Glory (optical phenomenon) =

Halo seen about the observer's shadow

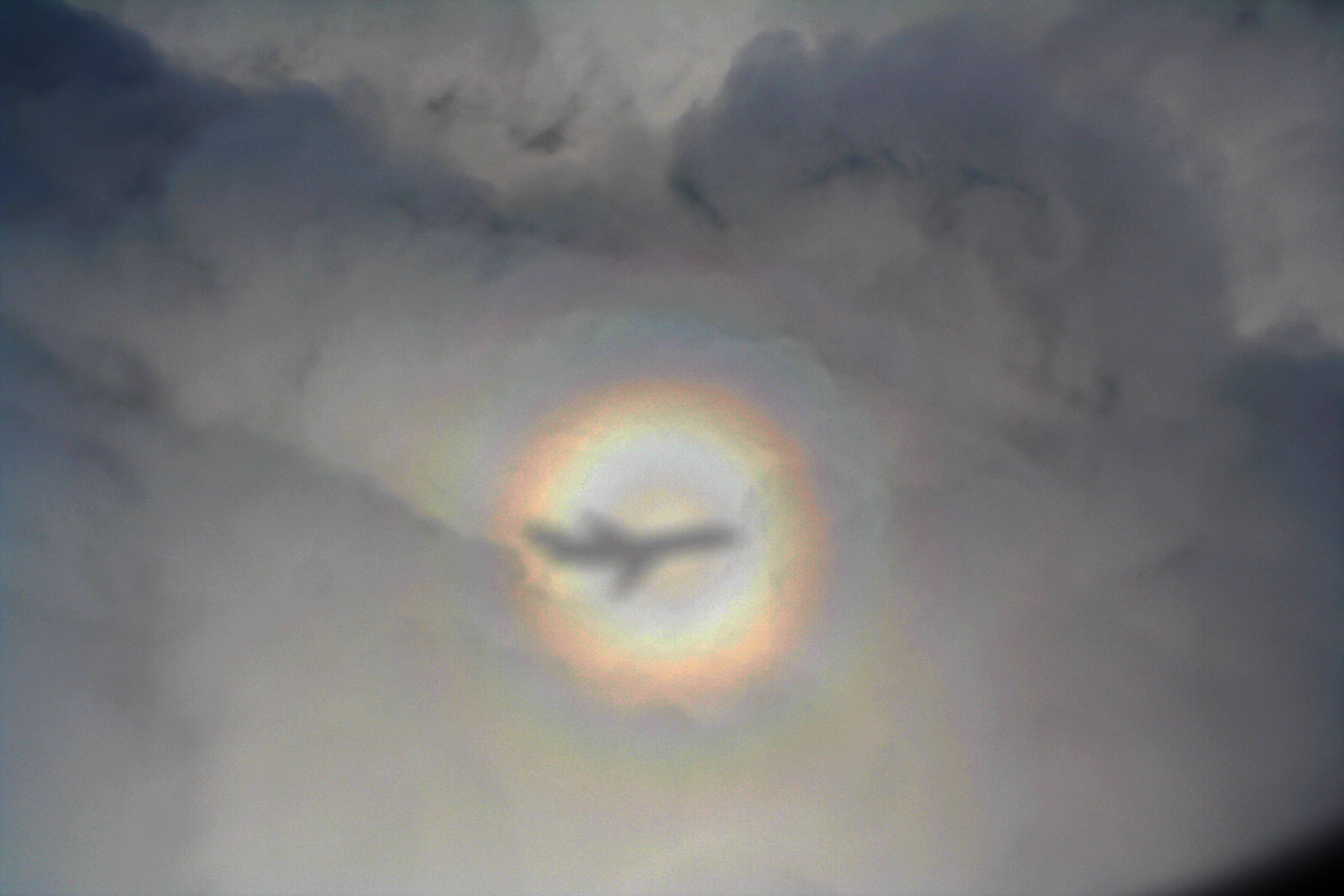
Glory around the shadow of a plane. The position of the glory's centre shows that the observer was in front of the wings.

A glory is an optical phenomenon, resembling an iconic saint's halo around the shadow of the observer's head, caused by sunlight or (more rarely) moonlight interacting with the tiny water droplets that comprise mist or clouds. The glory consists of one or more concentric, successively dimmer rings, each of which is red on the outside and bluish towards the centre. Due to its appearance, the phenomenon is sometimes mistaken for a circular rainbow, but the latter has a much larger diameter and is caused by different physical processes.

Glories arise due to wave interference of light internally refracted within small droplets.

== Appearance and observation ==
Depending on circumstances (such as the uniformity of droplet size in the clouds), one or more of the glory's rings can be visible. The rings are rarely complete, being interrupted by the shadow of the viewer. The angular size of the inner and brightest ring is much smaller than that of a rainbow, about 5° to 20°, depending on the size of the droplets. In the right conditions, a glory and a rainbow can occur simultaneously.

"Glories can be seen on mountains and hillsides, from aircraft and in sea fog and even indoors."

Like a rainbow, outdoor glories are centred on the antisolar (or, in case of the moon, antilunar) point, which coincides with the shadow of the observer's head. Because this point is diametrically opposite to the sun's (or moon's) position in the sky, it usually lies below the observer's horizon except at sun (or moon) rise and set. Outdoor glories are commonly observed from aircraft. In the latter case, if the plane is flying sufficiently low for its shadow to be visible on the clouds, the glory always surrounds it. This is sometimes called The Glory of the Pilot.

In 2024 astronomers suggested that the existence of glory might explain certain observations of the exoplanet WASP-76b. If this interpretation could be confirmed, it would become the first extrasolar glory-like phenomenon to be discovered.

=== Brocken spectre ===
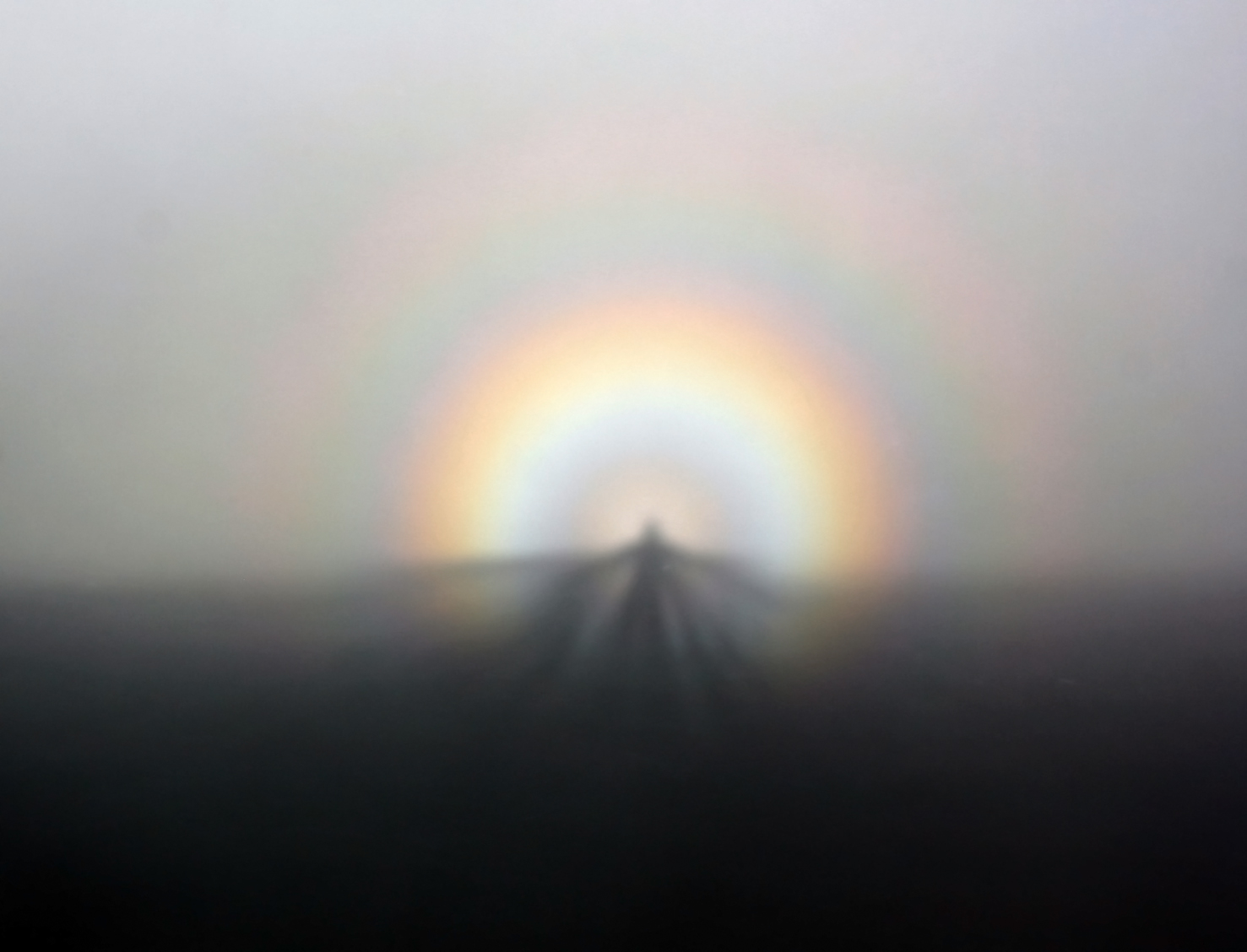
A solar glory and Brocken spectre

When viewed from a mountain or tall building, glories are often seen in association with a "Brocken spectre": the apparently enormously magnified shadow of an observer, cast (when the sun is low) on clouds below the mountain or tall building on which the viewer is standing. The name derives from the Brocken, the tallest peak of the Harz mountain range in Germany. Because the peak is above the cloud level and the area is frequently misty, conditions conducive to casting a shadow on a cloud layer are common. Giant shadows that seemed to move by themselves due to movement of the cloud layer (this movement is another part of the definition of the Brocken spectre), and that were surrounded by glories, may have contributed to the reputation the Harz mountains hold as a refuge for witches and evil spirits. In Goethe's Faust, the Brocken is called the Blocksberg and is the site of the Witches' Sabbath on Walpurgis Night.

=== Ulloa's halo ===
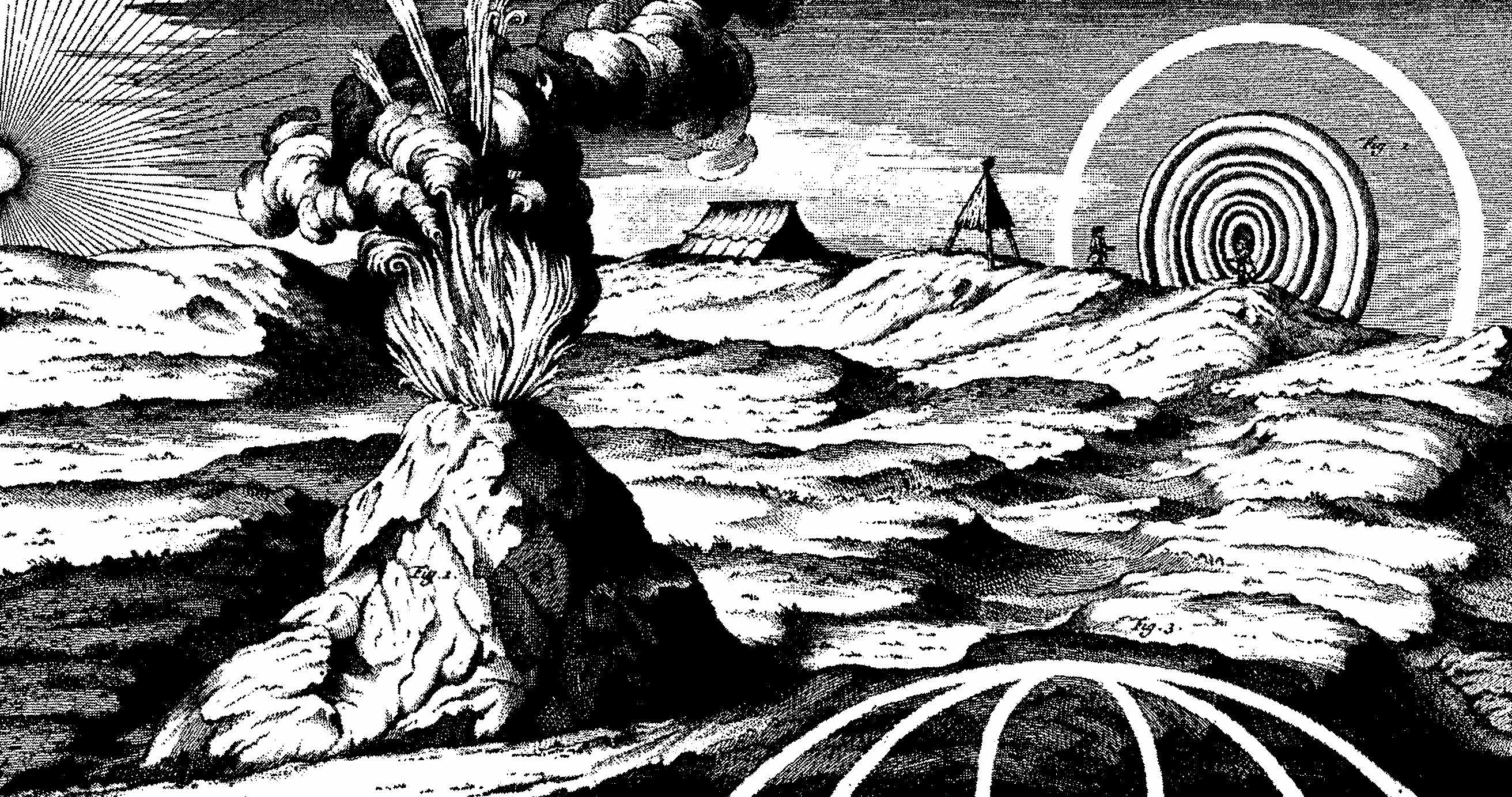
Illustration from Jorge Juan's and Antonio de Ulloa's, Voyage to South America (1748), depicting three separate scenes: (1) on the left, an erupting volcano; (2) on the upper right, optical glories surrounded by a fog bow; and (3) on the lower right, arcs of white light near a mountaintop

Before the first reports of the phenomenon in Europe, two members of the French Geodesic Mission to the Equator, Antonio de Ulloa and Pierre Bouguer, reported that while walking near the summit of the Pambamarca mountain, in the Ecuadorian Andes, they saw their shadows projected on a lower-lying cloud, with a circular "halo or glory" around the shadow of the observer's head. Ulloa noted that

The most surprising thing was that, of the six or seven people that were present, each one saw the phenomenon only around the shadow of his own head, and saw nothing around other people’s heads.

This was then called "Ulloa's halo" or "Bouguer's halo". Ulloa reported that the glories were surrounded by a larger ring of white light, which would today be called a fog bow. On other occasions, he observed arches of white light formed by reflected moonlight, whose explanation is unknown but which may have been related to ice-crystal halos.

== Theory ==
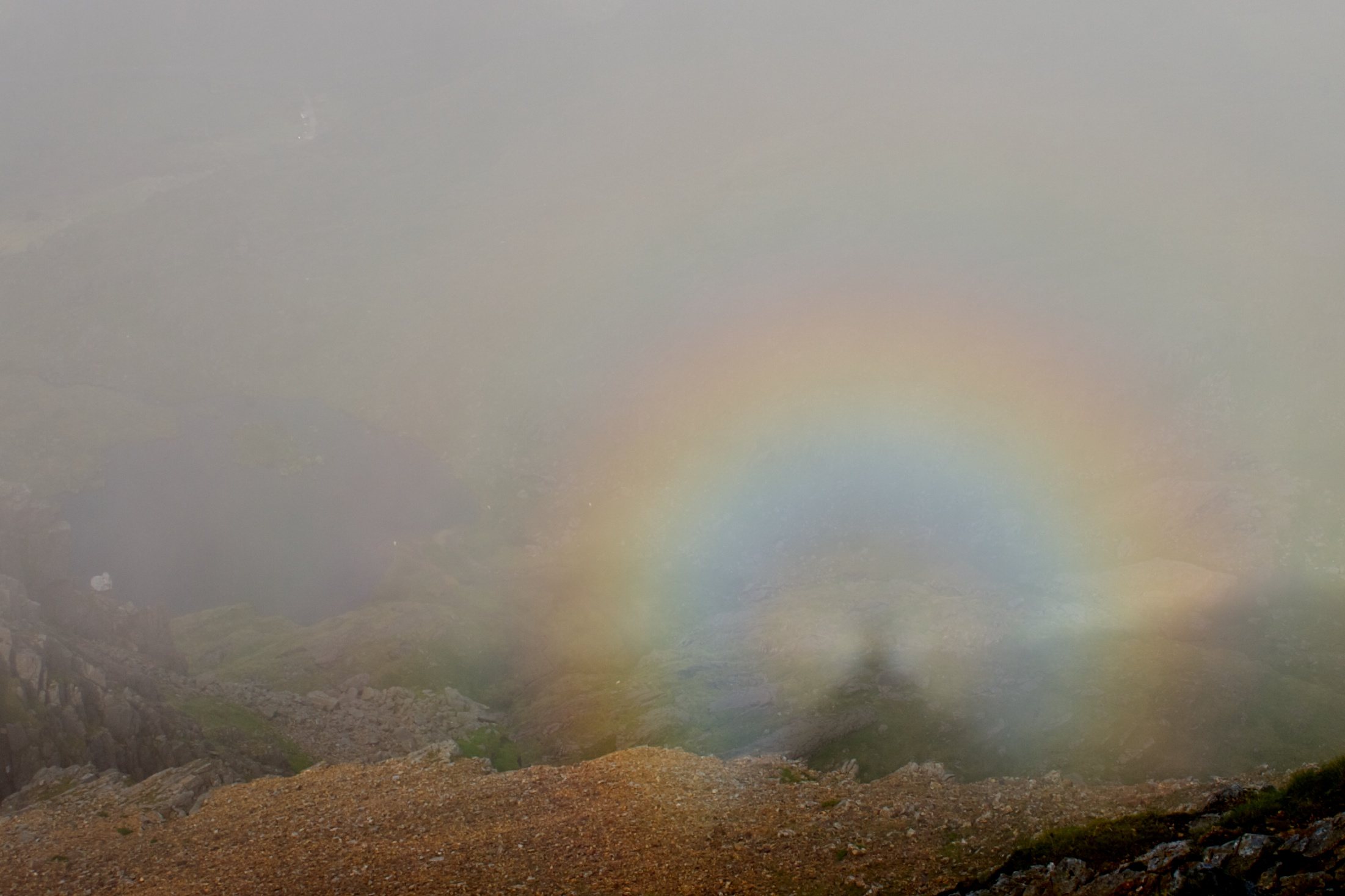
A solar glory and Brocken spectre from Crib Goch in 2008

Modern theories of light, first described by Henri Poincaré in 1887, are able to explain the phenomenon of glories through the complex angular momentum (rotation) of the electromagnetic field of a light wave, and do not need quantum theories. A summary of rainbowlike phenomena was provided in Scientific American in 1977, and states:

It is gratifying to discover in the elegant but seemingly abstract theory of complex angular momentum an explanation for these two natural phenomena [Glories and 10th order Rainbows], and to find there an unexpected link between them.

— H.M Nussenzveig

Most 20th century work on the phenomenon of rainbows and glories has focused on determining the correct intensity of light at each point in the phenomenon, which does require quantum theories. In 1947, the Dutch astronomer Hendrik van de Hulst suggested that surface waves are involved. He speculated that the brightness of the coloured rings of the glory are caused by two-ray interference between "short" and "long" path surface waves—which are generated by light rays entering the droplets at diametrically opposite points (both rays suffer one internal reflection). A theory by Brazilian physicist Herch Moysés Nussenzveig suggests that the light energy beamed back by a glory originates mostly from classical wave tunneling (synonymous in the paper to the evanescent wave coupling), which is an interaction between an evanescent light wave traveling along the surface of the drop and the waves inside the drop.

== In culture ==
C. T. R. Wilson saw a glory while working as a temporary observer at the Ben Nevis weather station. Inspired by the impressive sight, he decided to build a device for creating clouds in the laboratory, so that he could make a synthetic, small-scale glory. His work led directly to the cloud chamber, a device for detecting ionizing radiation for which he and Arthur Compton received the Nobel Prize for Physics in 1927.

In China, the phenomenon is called Buddha's light (or halo). It is often observed on cloud-shrouded high mountains, such as Huangshan and Mount Emei. Records of the phenomenon at Mount Emei date back to A.D. 63. The colourful halo always surrounds the observer's own shadow, and thus was often taken to show the observer's personal enlightenment (associated with Buddha or divinity).

Stylized glories appear occasionally in Western heraldry. Two glories appear on the Great Seal of the United States: A glory breaking through clouds surrounding a cluster of 13 stars on the obverse, and a glory surrounding the Eye of Providence surmounting an unfinished pyramid on the reverse.

== Gallery ==
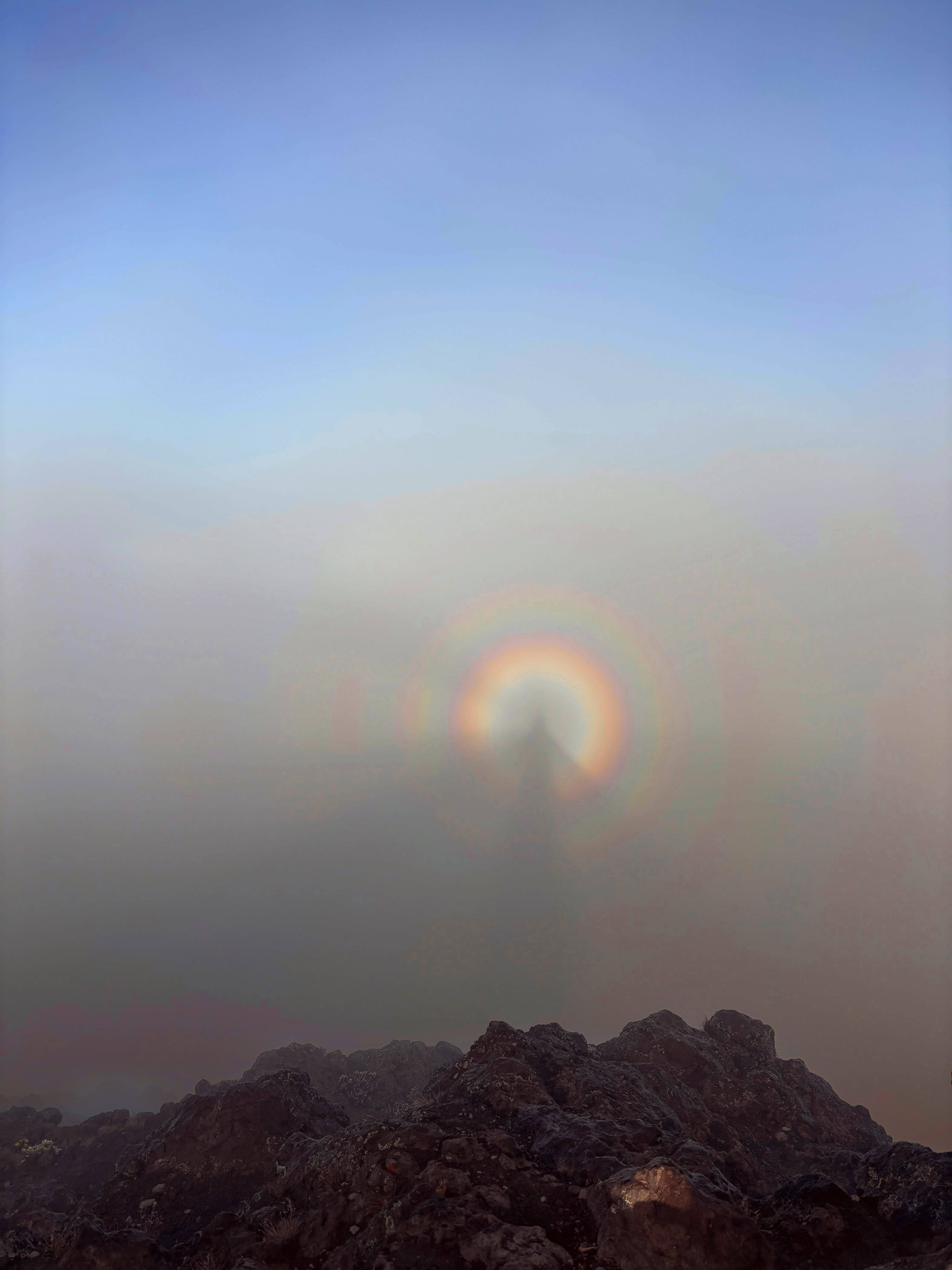
Brocken Spectre Glory seen from summit of Mount Meru, Tanzania.

Glory seen from a descending airplane

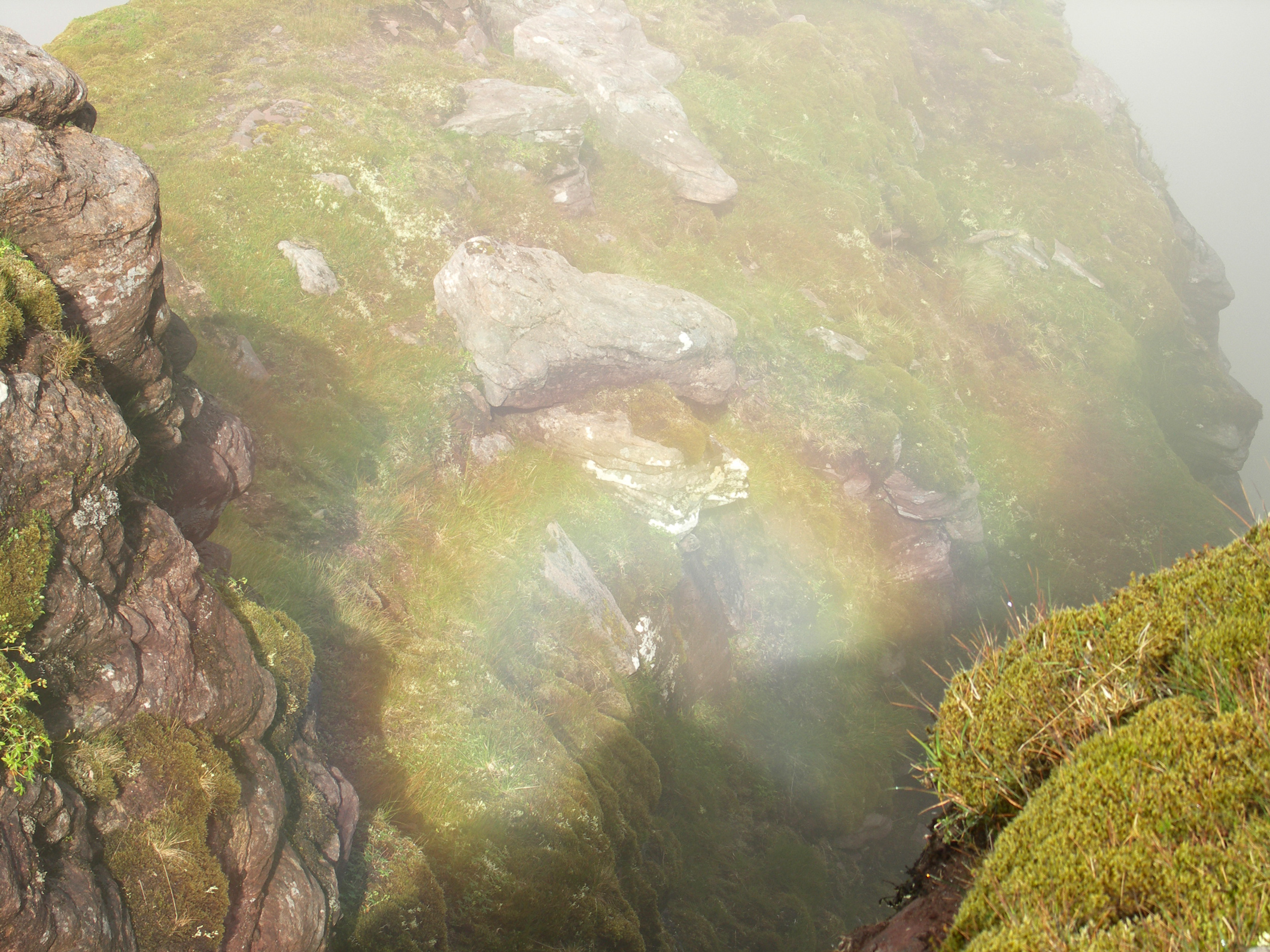
Glory encountered during a hike in An Teallach, Scotland

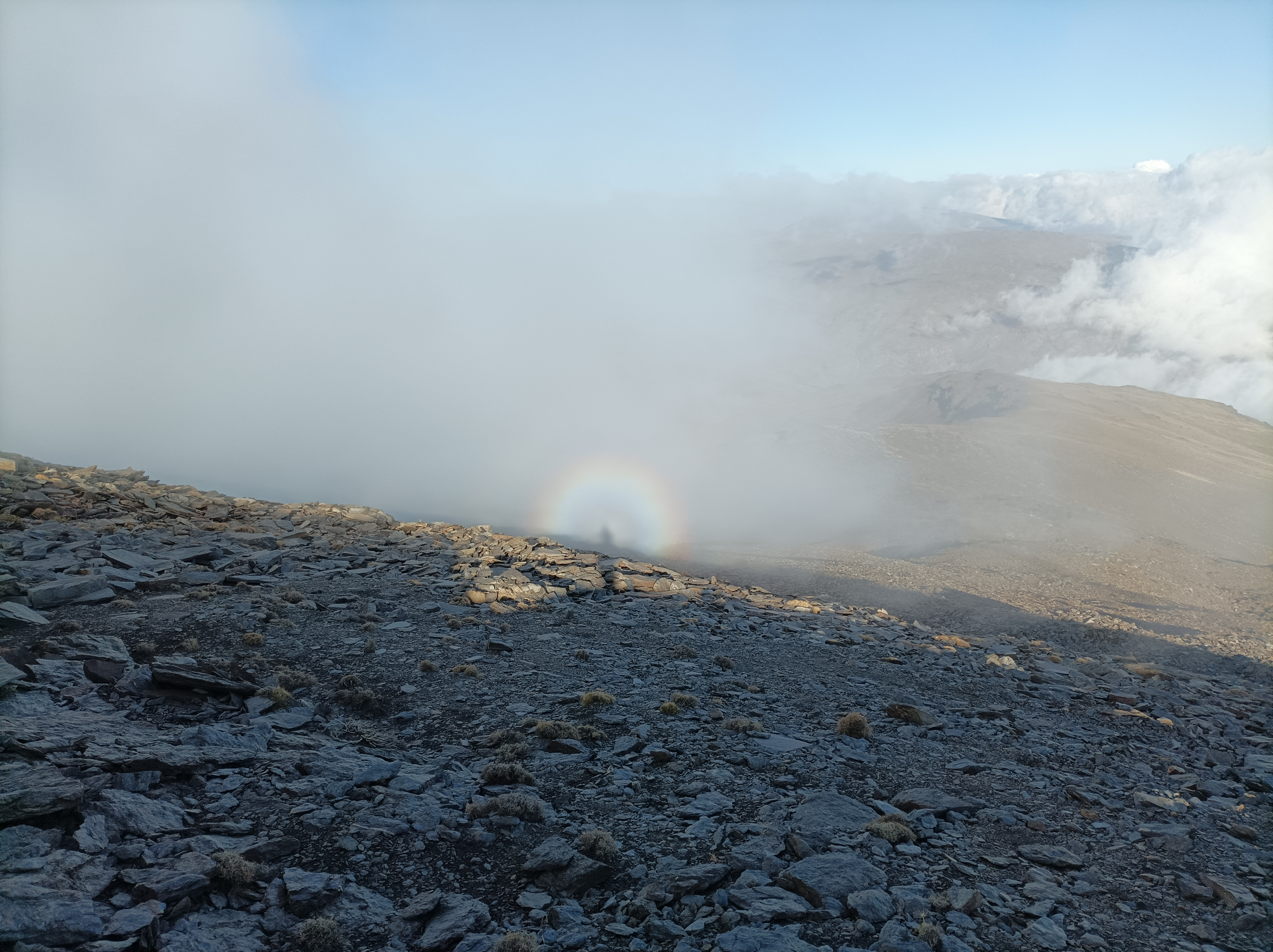
Glory as seen on the Sierra Nevada mountains in Spain close to Trevélez, Peñón del Globo

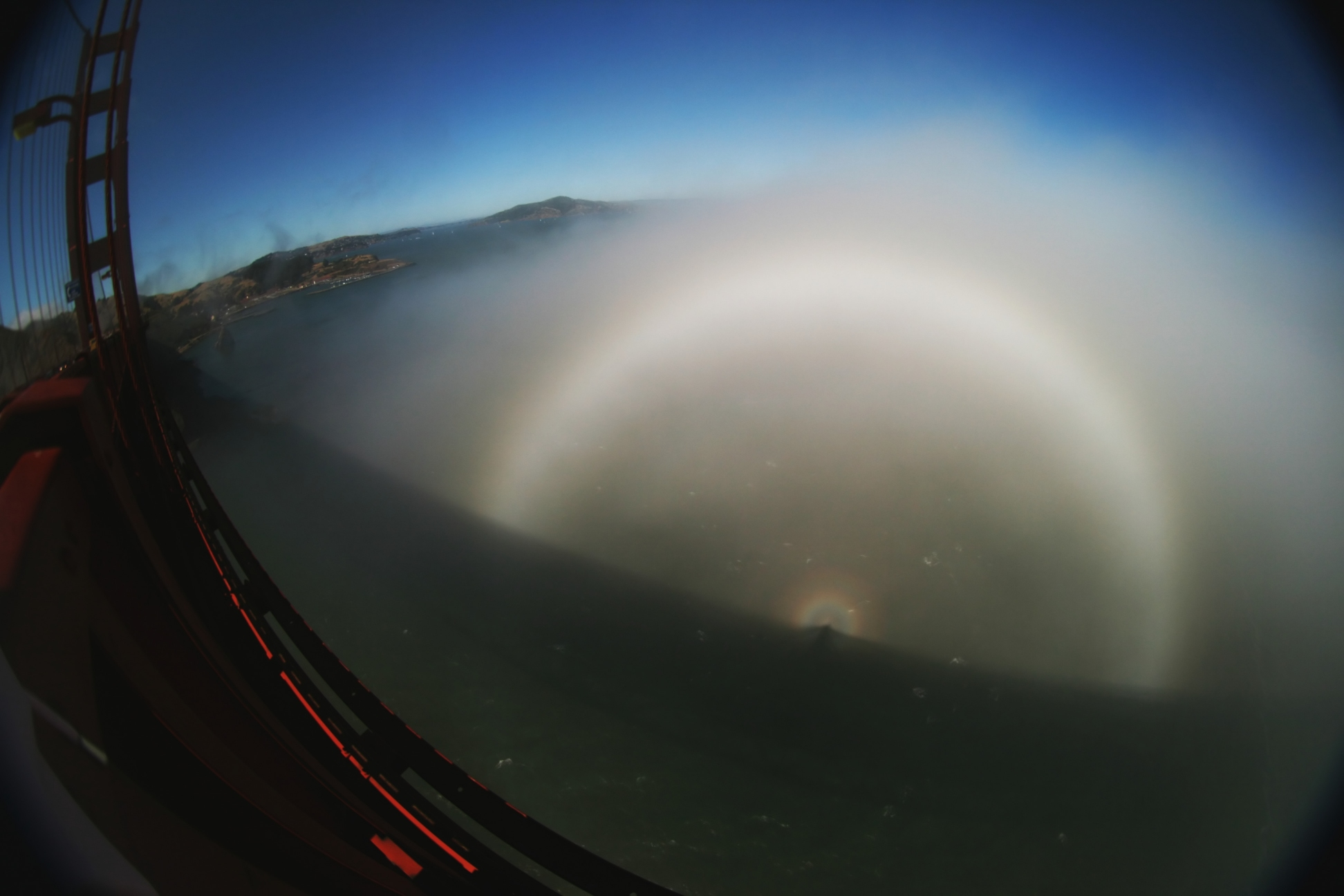
A fog bow, solar glory and Brocken spectre at the Golden Gate Bridge in San Francisco

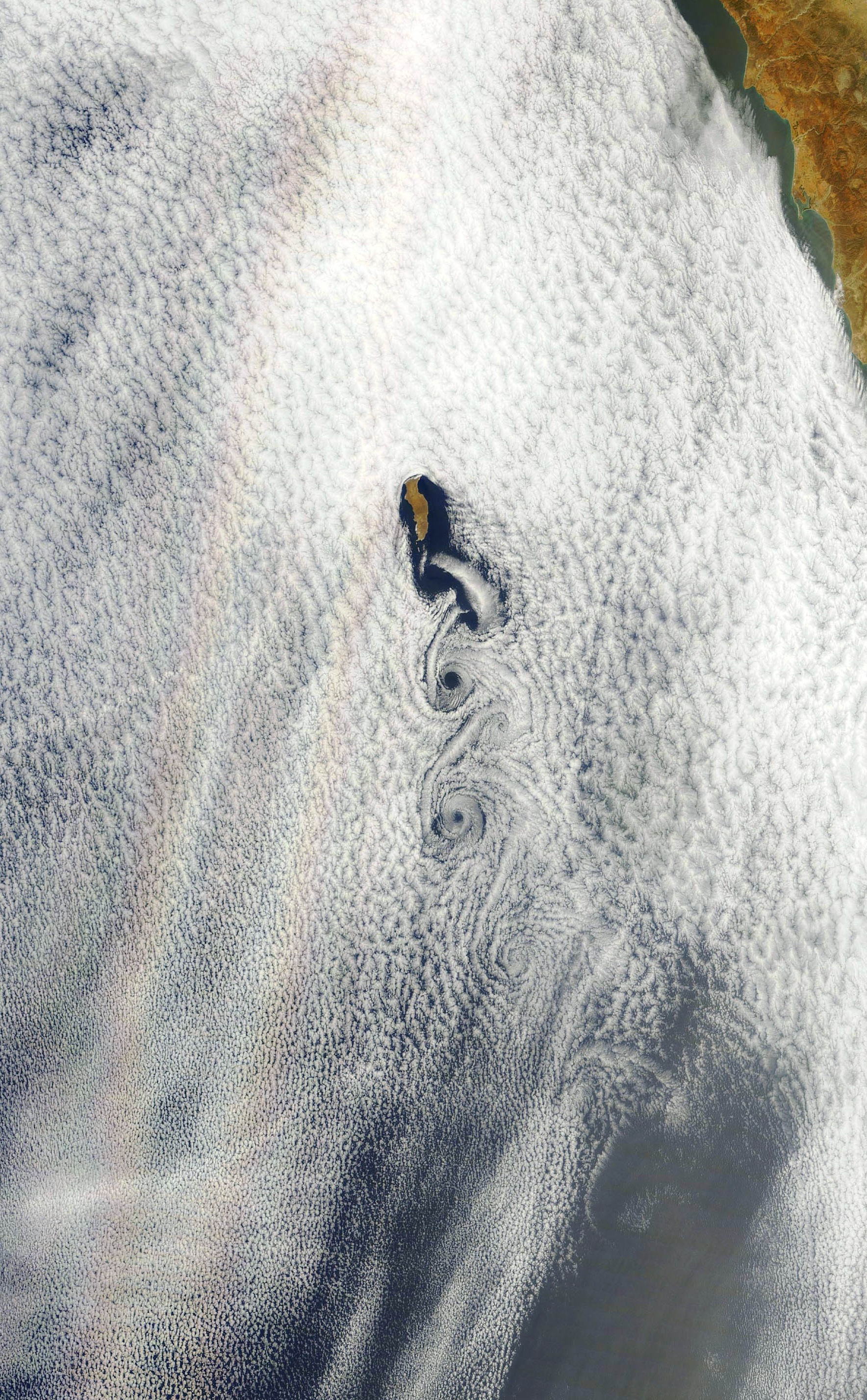
Glory captured from space. The elongated shape is an artifact of the composite stitching of the photo, not its real shape.

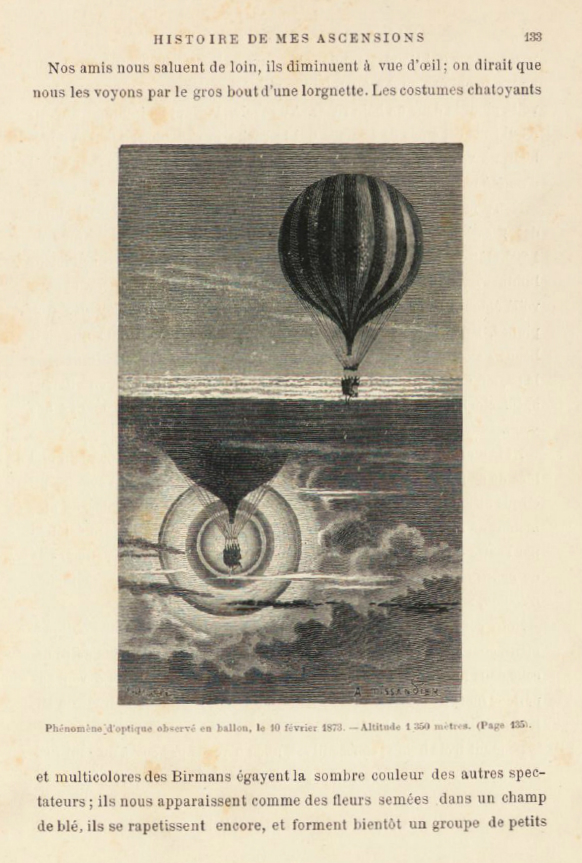
19th century drawing of a glory observed from a hydrogen balloon. From: G. Tissandier, Histoire de mes ascensions (1887), p. 133.

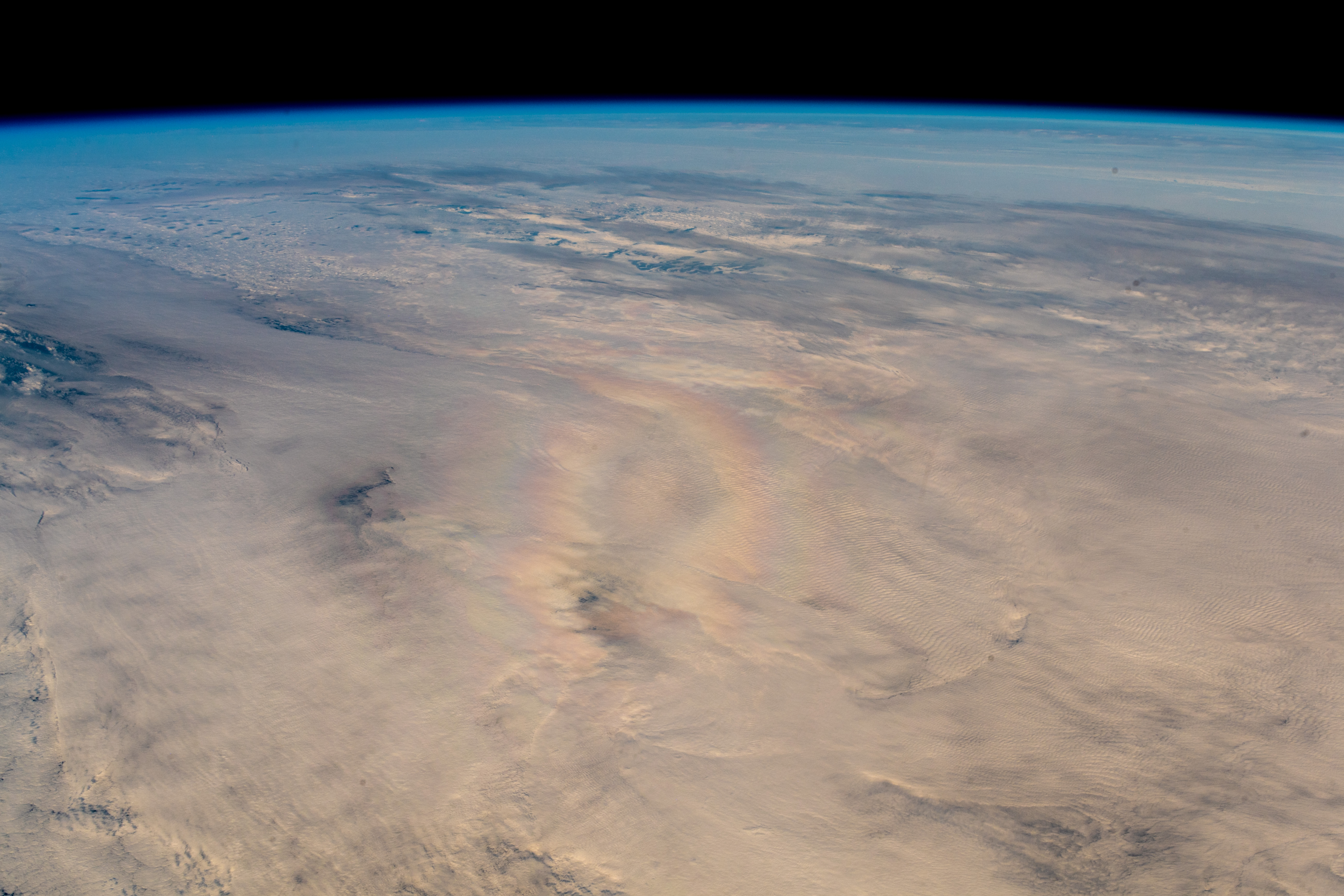
Glory seen from the international space station

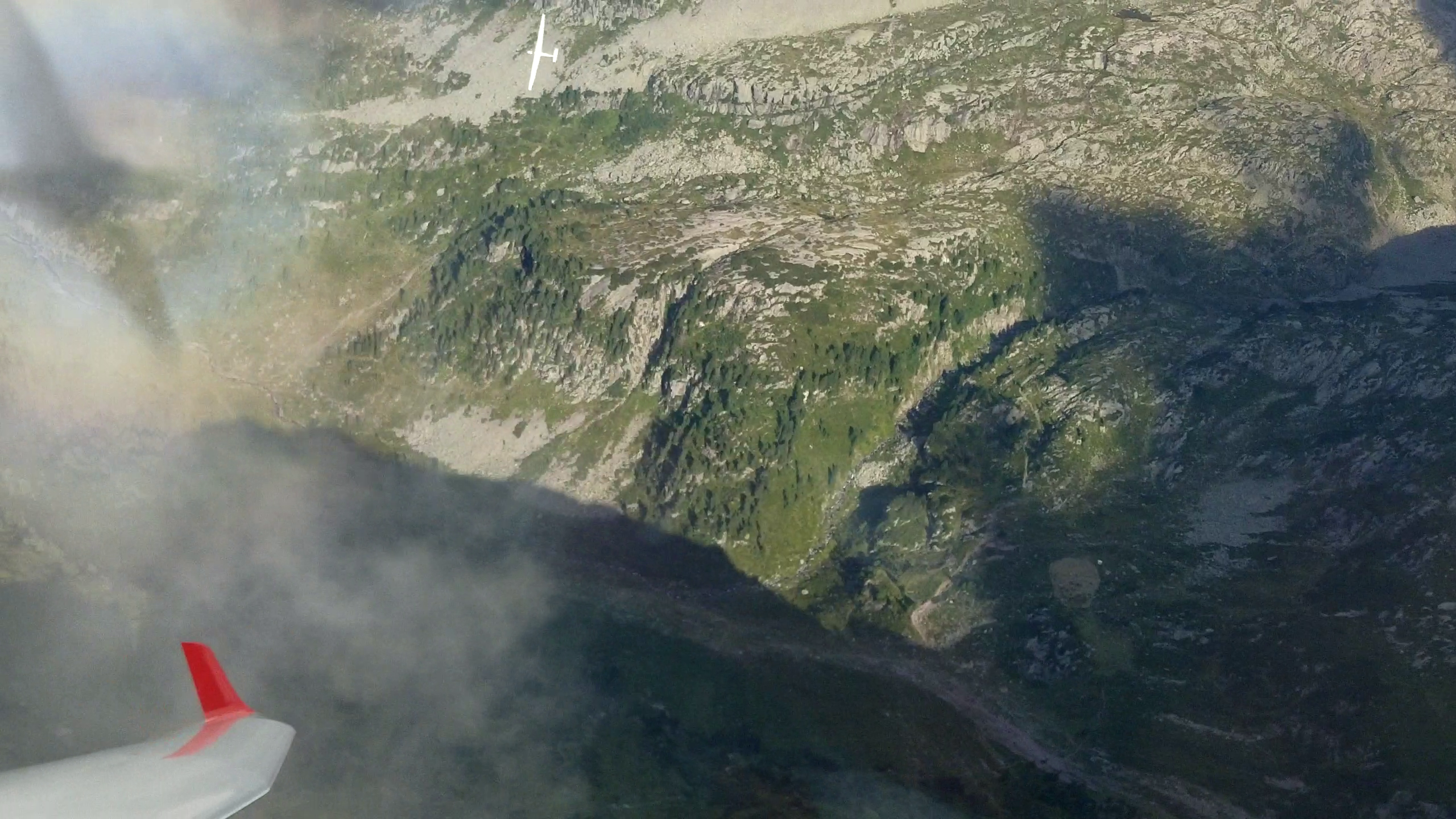
Glory captured from aboard a glider climbing in the Alpe Cermis area – Trentino, Northern Italy.

== See also ==
- Antisolar point – Point on the celestial sphere opposite Sun
- Aureola – Halo or radiance in art for holy persons
- Corona (optical phenomenon) – Optical phenomenon of the sky
- Brocken spectre – Atmospheric optical phenomenon
- Gegenschein – Optical effect of interplanetary dust reflections
- Halo (optical phenomenon) – Optical phenomenon of the sky
- Heiligenschein – Optical phenomenon
- Opposition surge – Optical effect
- Rainbow – Meteorological phenomenon
- Subparhelic circle – Rare atmospheric optical phenomenon
- Sun dog – Atmospheric optical phenomenon
- Sylvanshine – Optical phenomenon

== Additional reading ==
- Mayes, Lawrence (1 September 2003), Glories – an Atmospheric Phenomenon, archived from the original on 16 August 2007
- Nave, R (n.d.), Glories
- Nussenzveig, H. Moysés (1 January 2012). "The Science of the Glory". Scientific American. 306 (1): 68–73. Bibcode:2011SciAm.306f..68N. doi:10.1038/SCIENTIFICAMERICAN0112-68. ISSN 0036-8733. PMID 22279838. S2CID 38936268. Wikidata Q83329963.
