= Heiligenschein =

Optical phenomenon

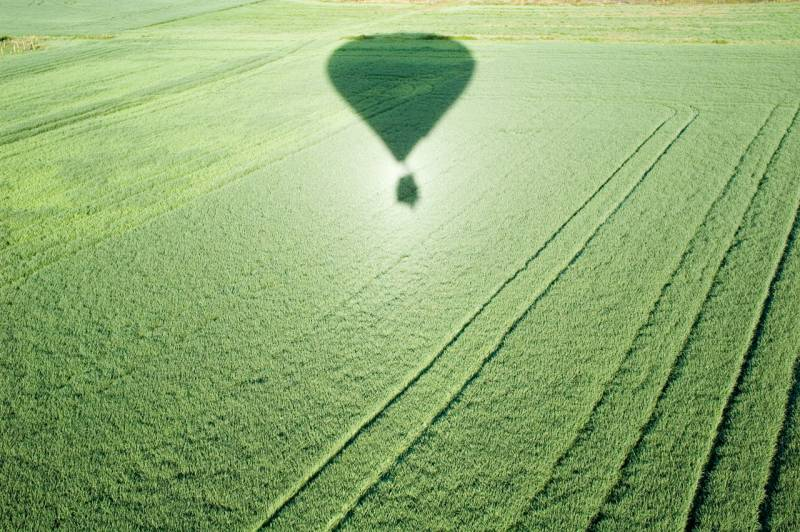
Heiligenschein, or hotspot, around the shadow of a hot-air balloon cast on a field of standing crops (Oxfordshire, England)

Heiligenschein (German: [ˈhaɪlɪɡn̩ˌʃaɪn]; lit. 'halo, aureola') is an optical phenomenon in which a bright spot appears around the shadow of the viewer's head in the presence of dew. In photogrammetry and remote sensing, it is more commonly known as the hotspot. It is also occasionally known as Cellini's halo after the Italian artist and writer Benvenuto Cellini (1500–1571), who described the phenomenon in his memoirs in 1562.

Nearly spherical dew droplets act as lenses to focus the light onto the surface behind them. When this light scatters or reflects off that surface, the same lens re-focuses that light into the direction from which it came. This configuration is similar to a cat's eye retroreflector. However a cat's eye retroreflector needs a refractive index of around 2, while water has a much smaller refractive index of approximately 1.33. This means that the water droplets focus the light about 20% to 50% of the diameter beyond the rear surface of the droplet. When dew droplets are suspended on trichomes at approximately this distance away from the surface of a plant, the combination of droplet and plant acts as a retroreflector. Any retroreflective surface is brightest around the antisolar point.

Opposition surge by other particles than water and the glory in water vapour are similar effects caused by different mechanisms.

== See also ==
- Aureole effect
- Brocken spectre, the magnified shadow of an observer cast upon the upper surfaces of clouds opposite the Sun
- Gegenschein, the brightening of interplanetary dust (zodiacal light) visible in the night sky toward the antisolar point
- Retroreflector
- Subparhelic circle
- Sylvanshine
