= Antisolar point =

Point on the celestial sphere opposite Sun

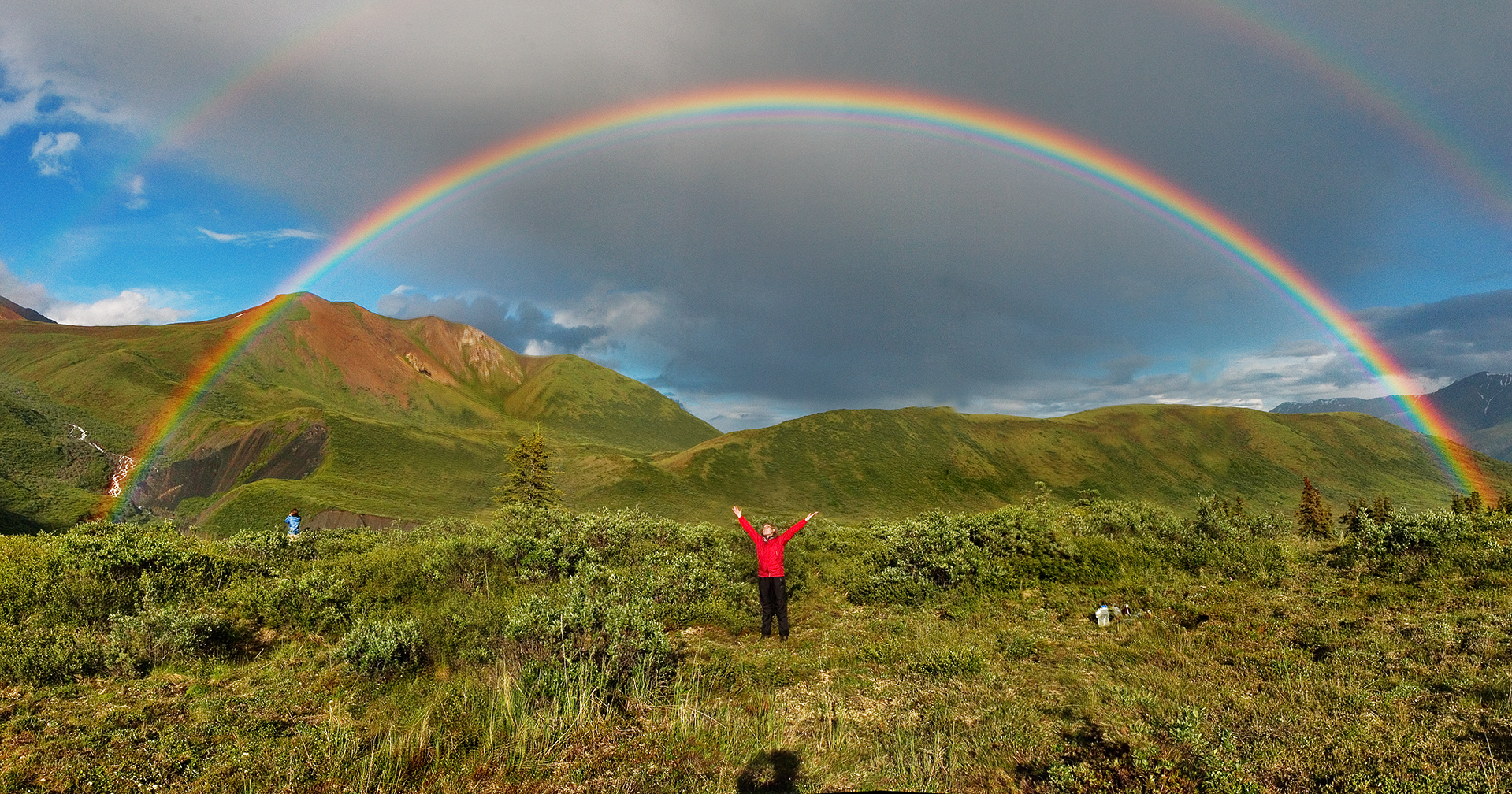
A rainbow has 42° centered around the antisolar point, which always coincides with the shadow of the observer's eye/camera, seen here at the bottom of the frame.

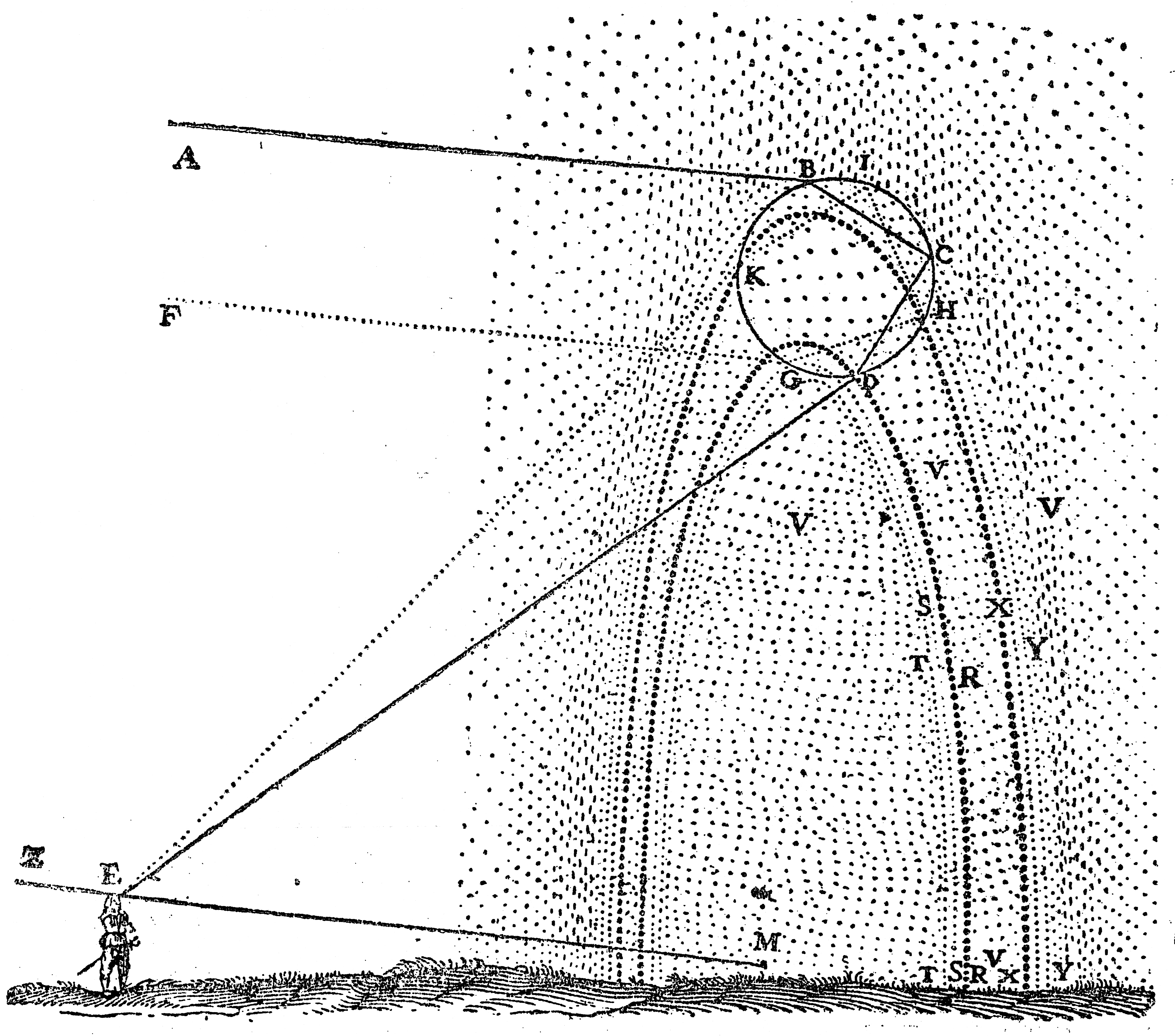
Drawing by René Descartes explaining the formation of a rainbow. The antisolar point is the center of the rainbow M. It lies at the end of the straight line running from the sun through the observer's eye E.

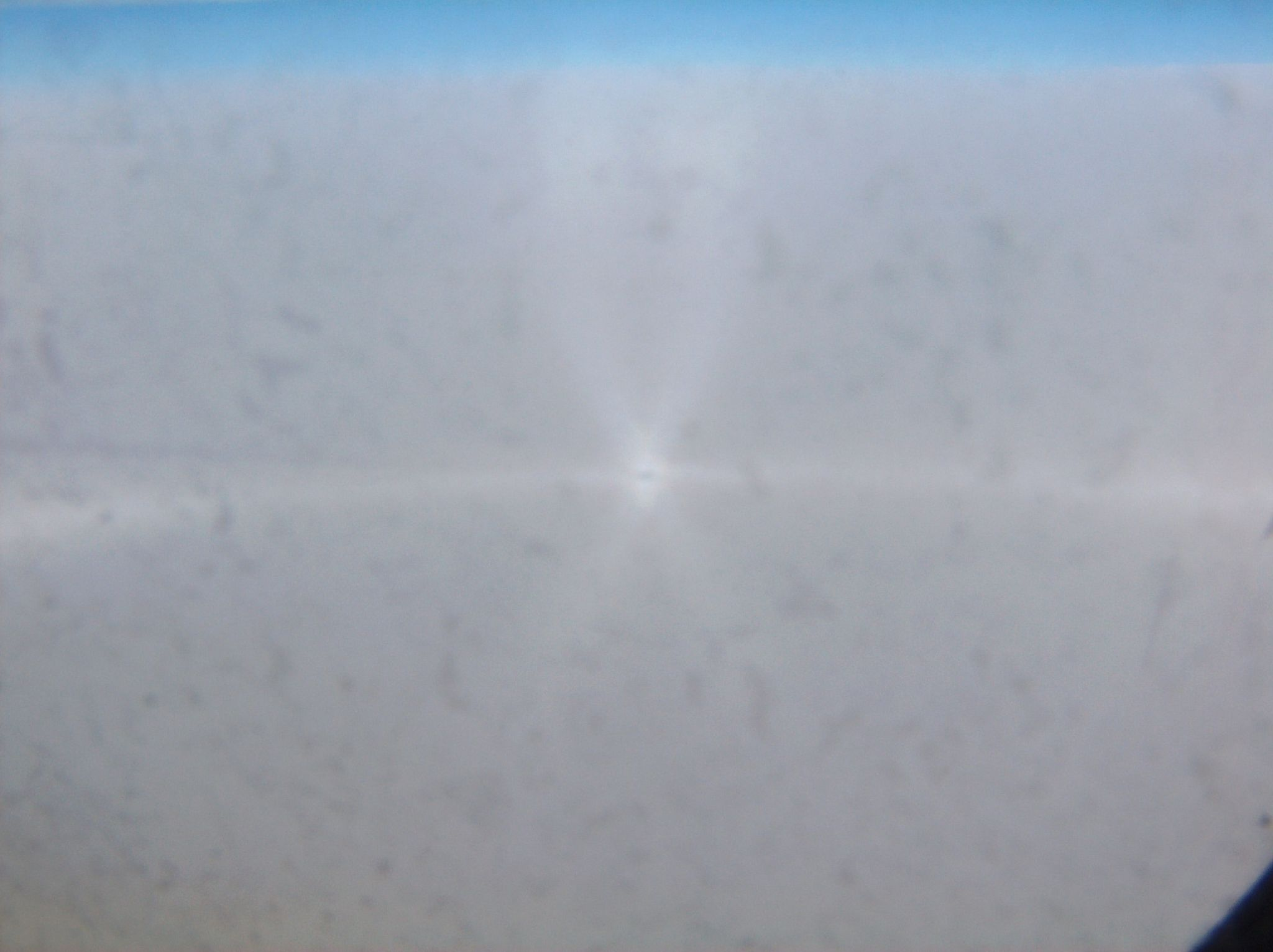
Centered on the antisolar point, this photo features various antisolar/subhorizon haloes, as viewed from a plane.

The antisolar point is the abstract point on the celestial sphere directly opposite the Sun from an observer's perspective. This means that the antisolar point lies above the horizon when the Sun is below it, and vice versa. On a sunny day, the antisolar point can be easily found; it is located within the shadow of the observer's head. Like the zenith and nadir, the antisolar point is not fixed in three-dimensional space, but is defined relative to the observer. Each observer has an antisolar point that moves as the observer changes position.

The antisolar point forms the geometric center of several optical phenomena, including subhorizon haloes, rainbows, glories, the Brocken spectre, and heiligenschein. Occasionally, around sunset or sunrise, anticrepuscular rays appear to converge toward the antisolar point near the horizon. However, this is an optical illusion caused by perspective; in reality, the "rays" (i.e. bands of shadow) run near-parallel to each other.

Also around the antisolar point, the gegenschein is often visible in a moonless night sky away from city lights, arising from the backscatter of sunlight by interplanetary dust. In astronomy, the full Moon or a planet in opposition lies near the antisolar point. During a total lunar eclipse, the full Moon enters the umbra of Earth's shadow, which the planet casts onto its atmosphere, into space, and toward the antisolar point.

== Anthelic point ==
The anthelic point is often used as a synonym for the antisolar point, but the two should be differentiated. While the antisolar point is directly opposite the sun, always below the horizon when the sun is up, the anthelic point is opposite but at the same elevation as the sun, and is therefore located on the parhelic circle. There are several halo phenomena that are centered on or converge on the anthelic point, such as the anthelion, Wegener arcs, Tricker arcs and the parhelic circle itself.

== See also ==
- Heiligenschein
- Opposition surge
- Subparhelic circle
- Sylvanshine
