= Opposition surge =

Optical effect

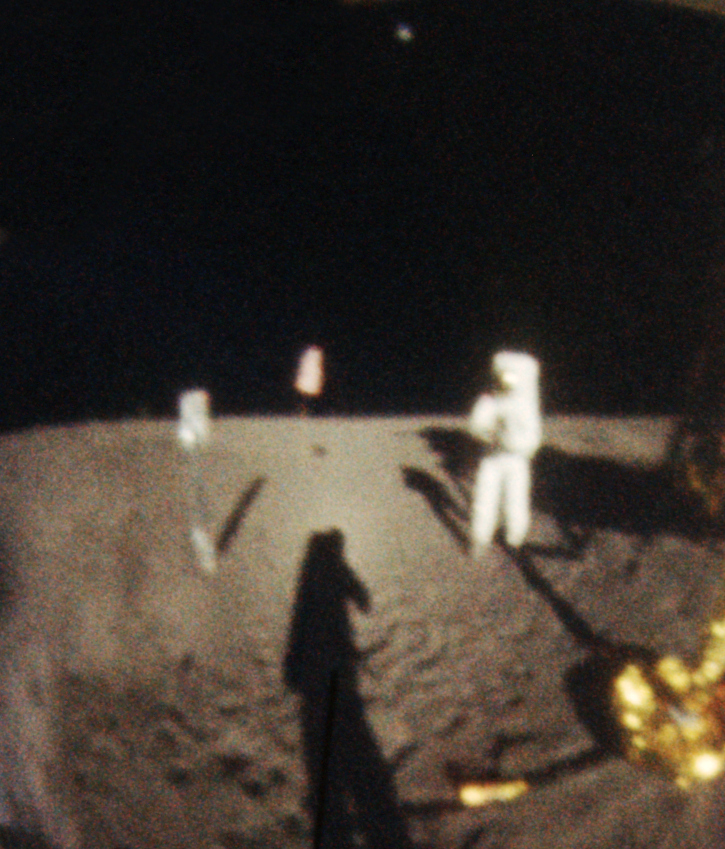
Opposition surge from the retroreflective lunar soil brightens the area around Buzz Aldrin's shadow during Apollo 11 (photo by Neil Armstrong).

The opposition surge (sometimes known as the opposition effect, opposition spike or Seeliger effect) is the brightening of a rough surface, or an object with many particles, when illuminated from directly behind the observer. The term is most widely used in astronomy, where generally it refers to the sudden noticeable increase in the brightness of a celestial body such as a planet, moon, or comet as its phase angle of observation approaches zero. It is so named because the reflected light from the Moon and Mars appear significantly brighter than predicted by simple Lambertian reflectance when at astronomical opposition. Two physical mechanisms have been proposed for this observational phenomenon: shadow hiding and coherent backscatter.

== Overview ==
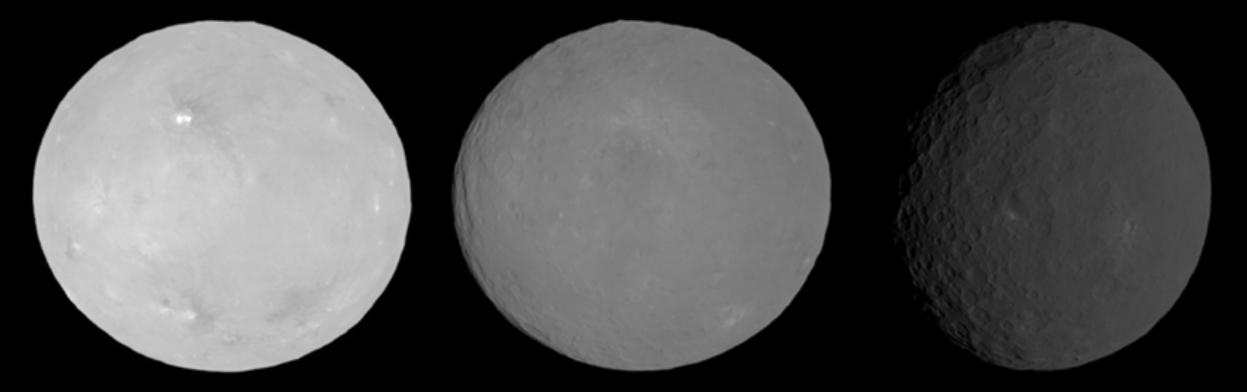
Dwarf planet Ceres, imaged by the Dawn spacecraft at phase angles of 0°, 7° and 33°. The left image at 0° phase angle shows much higher luminance due to the opposition effect.

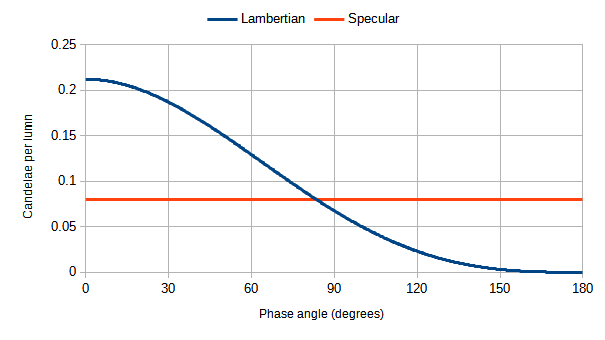
Luminous intensity versus phase angle for Lambertian and specular spheres. These do not show the opposition surge. The Lambertian case is when the surface scatters light from a spot such that the spot has the same luminance when viewed from any angle.

The phase angle is defined as the angle between the observer, the observed object and the source of light. In the case of the Solar System, the light source is the Sun, and the observer is generally on Earth. At zero phase angle, the Sun is directly behind the observer and the object is directly ahead, fully illuminated.

As the phase angle of an object lit by the Sun decreases, the object's luminous intensity increases. This is partly due to the increased area lit, but is also partly due to the intrinsic brightness (the luminance) of the part that is sunlit. This is affected by the illuminance of the surface, which is strongest right under the sun and goes to zero at the parts of the object that face at right angle to the sun. But the luminance is also affected by the angle at which light reflected from the object is observed. For this reason, moonlight at full moon is much more than at first or third quarter, even though the visible area illuminated is only twice as large.

== Physical mechanisms ==
=== Shadow hiding ===
When the angle of reflection is close to the angle at which the light's rays hit the surface (that is, when the Sun and the object are close to opposition from the viewpoint of the observer), this intrinsic brightness is usually close to its maximum. At a phase angle of zero degrees, all shadows disappear and the object is fully illuminated. When phase angles approach zero, there is a sudden increase in apparent brightness, and this sudden increase is referred to as the opposition surge.

The effect is particularly pronounced on regolith surfaces of airless bodies in the Solar System. The usual major cause of the effect is that a surface's small pores and pits that would otherwise be in shadow at other incidence angles become lit up when the observer is almost in the same line as the source of illumination. The effect is usually only visible for a very small range of phase angles near zero. For bodies whose reflectance properties have been quantitatively studied, details of the opposition effect – its strength and angular extent – are described by two of the Hapke parameters. In the case of planetary rings (such as Saturn's), an opposition surge is due to the uncovering of shadows on the ring particles. This explanation was first proposed by Hugo von Seeliger in 1887.

=== Coherent backscatter ===
A theory for an additional effect that increases brightness during opposition is that of coherent backscatter. In the case of coherent backscatter, the reflected light is enhanced at narrow angles if the size of the scatterers in the surface of the body is comparable to the wavelength of light and the distance between scattering particles is greater than a wavelength. The increase in brightness is due to the reflected light combining coherently with the emitted light.

Coherent backscatter phenomena have also been observed with radar. In particular, recent observations of Titan at 2.2 cm with Cassini have shown that a strong coherent backscatter effect is required to explain the high albedos at radar wavelengths.

=== Water droplets ===
On Earth, water droplets can also create bright spots around the antisolar point in various situations. For more details, see Heiligenschein and Glory (optical phenomenon).

== Throughout the Solar System ==
The existence of the opposition surge was described in 1956 by Tom Gehrels during his study of the reflected light from an asteroid. Gehrels' later studies showed that the same effect could be shown in the moon's brightness. He coined the term "opposition effect" for the phenomenon, but the more intuitive "opposition surge" is now more widely used.

Since Gehrels' early studies, an opposition surge has been noted for most airless solar system bodies. No such surge has been reported for bodies with significant atmospheres.

In the case of the Moon, B. J. Buratti et al. used observations from the Clementine spacecraft at very low phase angle to find that the moon's brightness increases by more than 40% between a phase angle of 4° and one of 0°. (Observation from Earth cannot be at a phase angle less than about half a degree without there being a lunar eclipse. A phase angle of 4° is achieved about eight hours before or after a lunar eclipse.) This increase is greater for the rougher-surfaced highland areas than for the relatively smooth maria. As for the principal mechanism of the phenomenon, measurements indicate that the opposition effect exhibits only a small wavelength dependence: the surge is 3-4% larger at 0.41 μm than at 1.00 μm. This result suggests that the principal cause of the lunar opposition surge is shadow-hiding rather than coherent backscatter.

== See also ==
- Albedo
- Bidirectional reflectance function
- Brocken spectre, the apparently enormous and magnified shadow of an observer cast upon the upper surfaces of clouds opposite the Sun
- Gegenschein
- Geometric albedo
