= Gegenschein =

Optical effect of interplanetary dust reflections

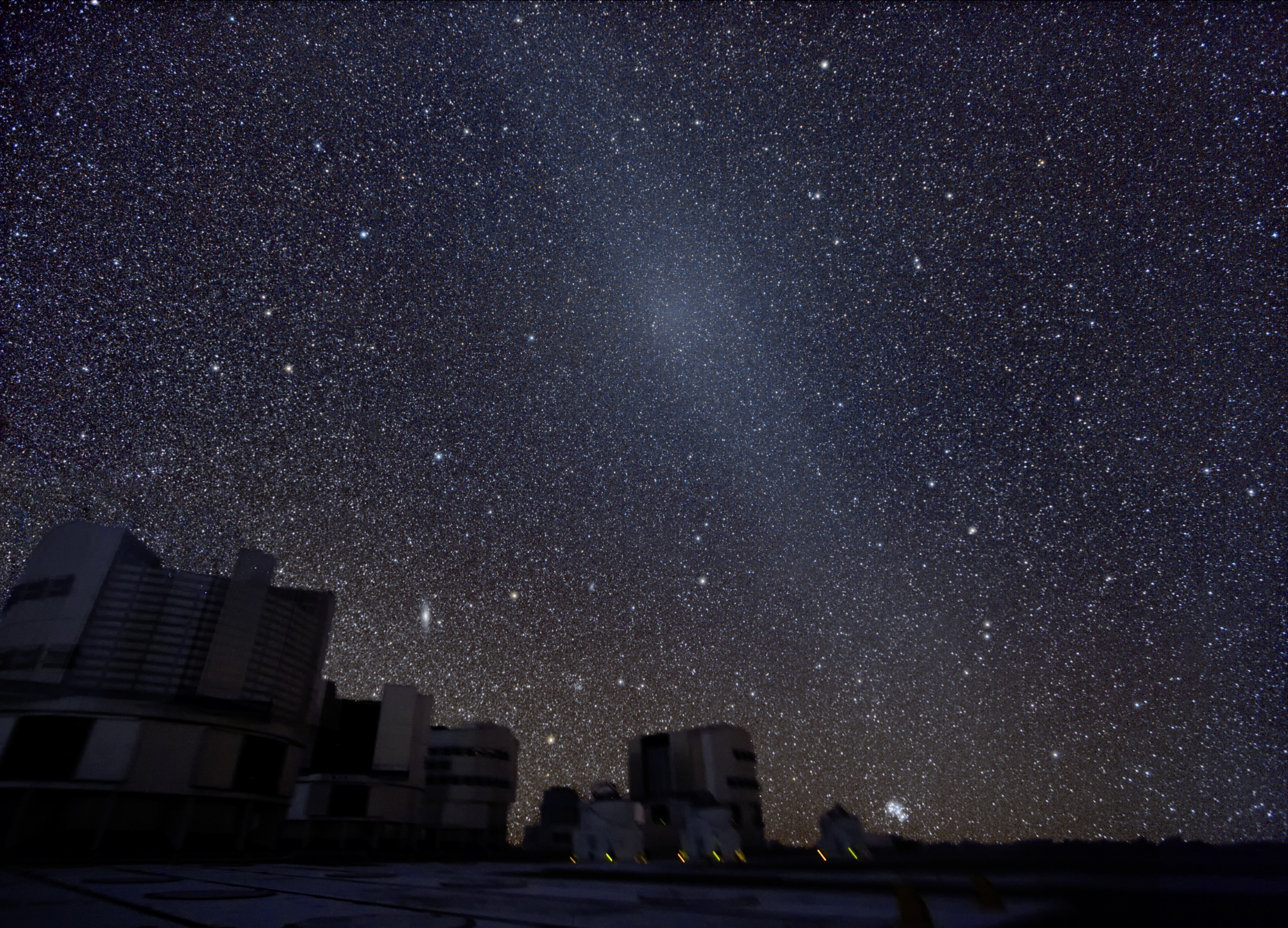
The gegenschein appears in this image as a bright spot on the diagonal band (running top left to lower right) above the Very Large Telescope. (The Andromeda Galaxy and Pleiades are prominent in the lower half of the image.)

Gegenschein (/ˈɡeɪɡənˌʃaɪn/; German: [ˈɡeːɡn̩ˌʃaɪn]; lit. 'counter-shine') or counterglow is a faintly bright spot in the night sky centered at the antisolar point. The backscatter of sunlight by interplanetary dust causes this optical phenomenon, being a zodiacal light and part of its zodiacal light band.

== Explanation ==
Like zodiacal light, gegenschein is sunlight scattered by interplanetary dust. Most of this dust orbits the Sun near the ecliptic plane, and it is hypothesized that the asteroid belt is responsible for most of the effect.

Gegenschein is distinguished from zodiacal light by its high angle of reflection of the incident sunlight on the dust particles. It forms a slightly brighter elliptical spot of 8–10° across directly opposite the Sun within the dimmer band of zodiacal light and zodiac constellation. The intensity of the gegenschein is relatively enhanced because each dust particle is seen at full phase, having a difficult to measure apparent magnitude of +5 to +6, with a very low surface brightness in the +10 to +12 magnitude range.

== History ==
It is commonly stated that the gegenschein was first described by the French Jesuit astronomer and professor Esprit Pézenas (1692–1776) in 1730. Further observations were supposedly made by the German explorer Alexander von Humboldt during his South American journey from 1799 to 1803. It was Humboldt who first used the German term Gegenschein. However, research conducted in 2021 by Texas State University astronomer and professor Donald Olson discovered that the Danish astronomer Theodor Brorsen was actually the first person to observe and describe one in 1854, although Brorsen had thought that Pézenas had observed it first. Olson believes what Pézenas actually observed was an auroral event, as he described the phenomenon as having a red glow; Olson found many other reports of auroral activity from around Europe and Asia on the same date Pézenas made his observation. Humboldt's report instead described glowing triangular patches on both the western and eastern horizons shortly after sunset, while true gegenschein is most visible near local midnight when it is highest in the sky.

Brorsen published the first thorough investigations of the gegenschein in 1854. T. W. Backhouse discovered it independently in 1876, as did Edward Emerson Barnard in 1882. In modern times, the gegenschein is not visible in most inhabited regions of the world due to light pollution.

An early theory suggested that gegenschein was due to a higher concentration of particles centered at the L_{2} point of the Earth–Sun system. However, the L_{2} point is strongly obscured by shadow of the Earth, which means that gegenschein would need to exhibit a very sharp shadow at the antisolar point. This theory was refuted in 1970 when more precise observations of the gegenschein showed no significant shadow, leading to an estimate that material around the L_{2} point could contribute at most 6% of the gegenschein's light.

== See also ==
- Antisolar point – Point on the celestial sphere opposite Sun
- Earth's shadow – Shadow that Earth itself casts through its atmosphere and into outer space
- Heiligenschein – Optical phenomenon
- Interplanetary dust cloud – Small particles between planets
- Kordylewski cloud – Concentrations of dust in the Earth–Moon system
- Opposition surge – Optical effect, the apparent brightening of a coarse surface or an aggregate of many particles when illuminated from directly behind the observer
- Sodium tail of the Moon
- Sylvanshine – Optical phenomenon
