= Phase angle (astronomy) =

Angle between the light incident on, and reflected from, an astronomical object

Phase angle diagram

In observational astronomy, phase angle is the angle between the light incident onto an observed object and the light reflected from the object. In the context of astronomical observations, this is usually the angle Sun-object-observer.

For terrestrial observations, "Sun–object–Earth" is often nearly the same thing as "Sun–object–observer", since the difference depends on the parallax, which in the case of observations of the Moon can be as much as 1°, or two full Moon diameters. With the development of space travel, as well as in hypothetical observations from other points in space, the notion of phase angle became independent of Sun and Earth.

The etymology of the term is related to the notion of planetary phases, since the brightness of an object and its appearance as a "phase" is the function of the phase angle.

The phase angle varies from 0° to 180°. The value of 0° corresponds to the position where the illuminator, the observer, and the object are collinear (all lying along the same line), with the illuminator and the observer on the same side of the object. The value of 180° is the position where the object is between the illuminator and the observer, known as inferior conjunction. Values less than 90° represent backscattering; values greater than 90° represent forward scattering.

For some objects, such as the Moon (see lunar phases), Venus and Mercury the phase angle (as seen from the Earth) covers the full 0–180° range. The superior planets cover shorter ranges. For example, for Mars the maximum phase angle is about 45°. For Jupiter, the maximum is 11.1° and for Saturn 6°.

The brightness of an object is a function of the phase angle, which is generally smooth, except for the so-called opposition spike near 0°, which does not affect gas giants or bodies with pronounced atmospheres, and when the object becomes fainter as the angle approaches 180°. This relationship is referred to as the phase curve.

== See also ==
- Illumination angle – Angle in geometric optics
- Incidence angle (optics) – Angle in geometric optics
