= Aureola =

Halo or radiance in art for holy persons

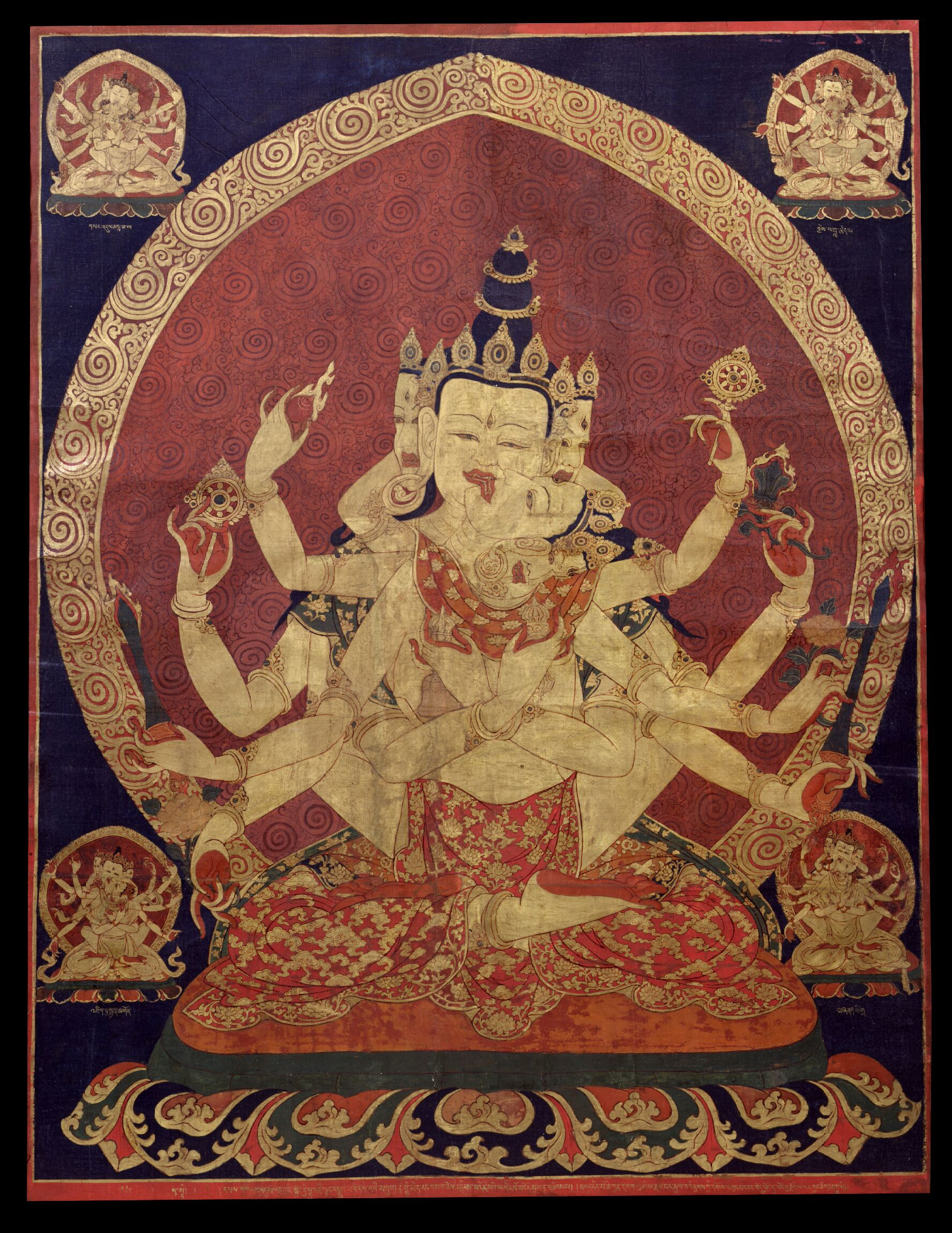
17th century Central Tibetan thanka of Guhyasamaja Akshobhyavajra, Rubin Museum of Art

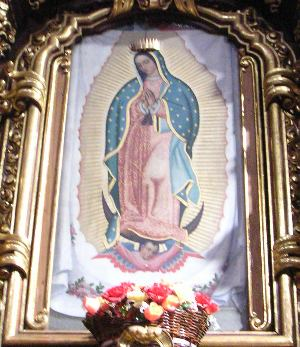
Images of Mary, mother of Jesus, are often surrounded by an aureole, as in this image of Our Lady of Guadalupe.

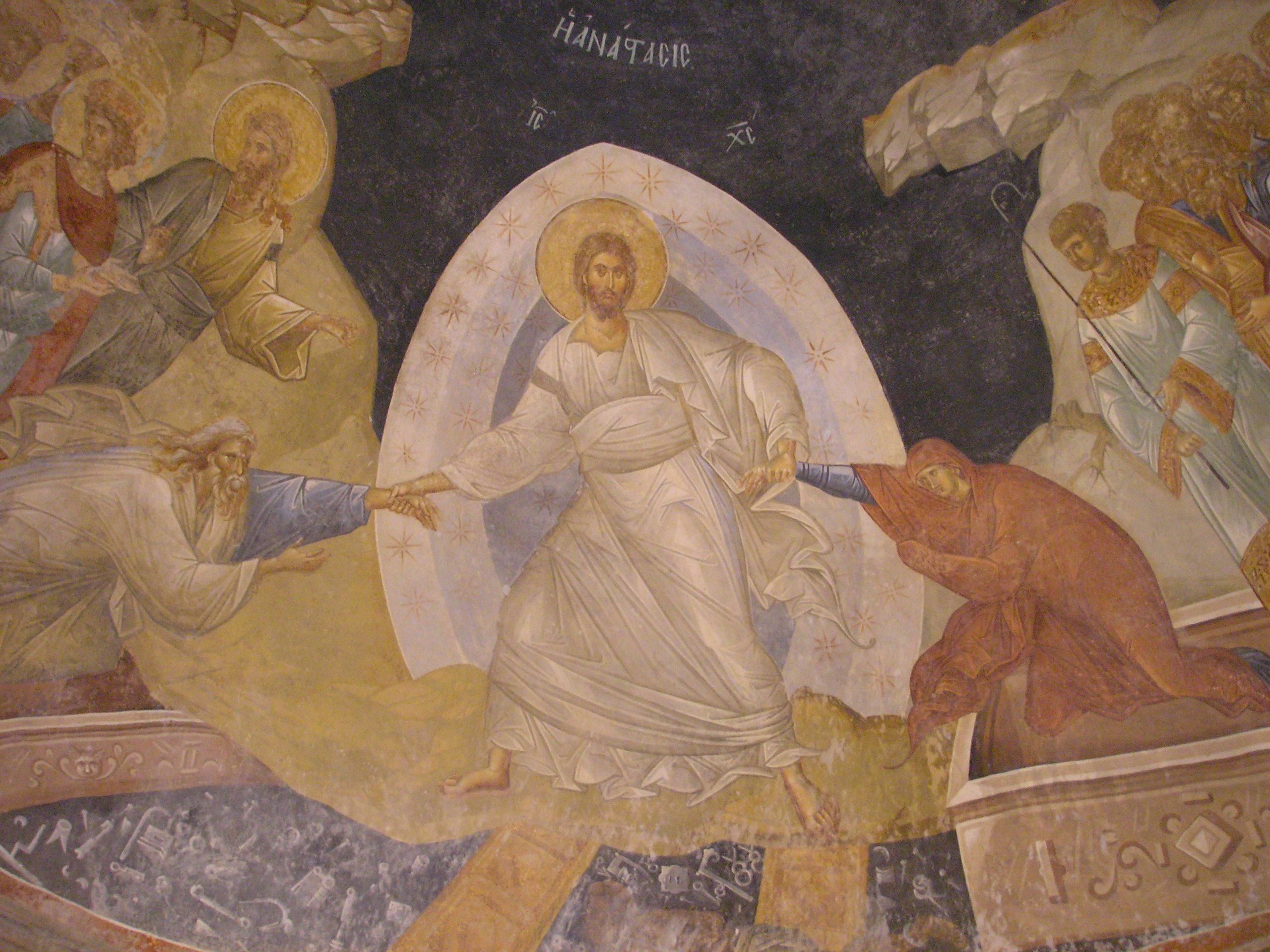
Resurrection of Christ, fresco in Chora Church, Istanbul

An aureola or aureole (diminutive of Latin aurea 'golden') is the radiance of luminous cloud which, in paintings of sacred personages, surrounds the whole figure.

In Romance languages, the noun Aureola is usually more related to the disc of light surrounding the head of sacred figures, which in English is called halo or nimbus. In Indian religions, the back or head halo is called prabhāmaṇḍala or prabhavali.

== In art ==
In the earliest periods of Christian art it was confined to the figures of the persons of the Christian Godhead, but it was afterwards extended to the Virgin Mary and to several of the saints.

The aureola, when enveloping the whole body, generally appears oval or elliptical in form, but occasionally depicted as circular, vesica piscis, or quatrefoil. When it appears merely as a luminous disk round the head, it is called specifically a halo or nimbus, while the combination of nimbus and aureole is called a glory. The strict distinction between nimbus and aureole is not commonly maintained, and the latter term is most frequently used to denote the radiance round the heads of saints, angels or Persons of the Trinity.

This is not to be confused with the specific motif in art of the Christ Child appearing to be a source of light in a Nativity scene. These depictions derive directly from the accounts given by Saint Bridget of Sweden of her visions, in which she describes seeing this.

=== Development ===
The nimbus in Christian art first appeared in the 5th century, but practically the same motif was known from several centuries earlier, in pre-Christian Hellenistic art. It is found in some Persian representations of kings and gods, and appears on coins of the Kushan kings Kanishka, Huvishka and Vasudeva, as well as on most representations of the Buddha in Greco-Buddhist art from the 1st century AD. Its use has also been traced through the Egyptians to the ancient Greeks, representations of Trajan (arch of Constantine) and Antoninus Pius (reverse of a medal) being found with it. Roman emperors were sometimes depicted wearing a radiant crown, with pointed rays intended to represent the rays of the sun.

In the circular form the nimbus constitutes a natural and even primitive use of the idea of a crown, modified by an equally simple idea of the emanation of light from the head of a superior being, or by the meteorological phenomenon of a halo. The probability is that all later associations with the symbol refer back to an early astrological origin (compare Mithras), the person so glorified being identified with the sun and represented in the sun's image; so the aureole is the Hvareno of Mazdaism. From this early astrological use, the form of "glory" or "nimbus" has been adapted or inherited under new beliefs.

=== Mandorla ===
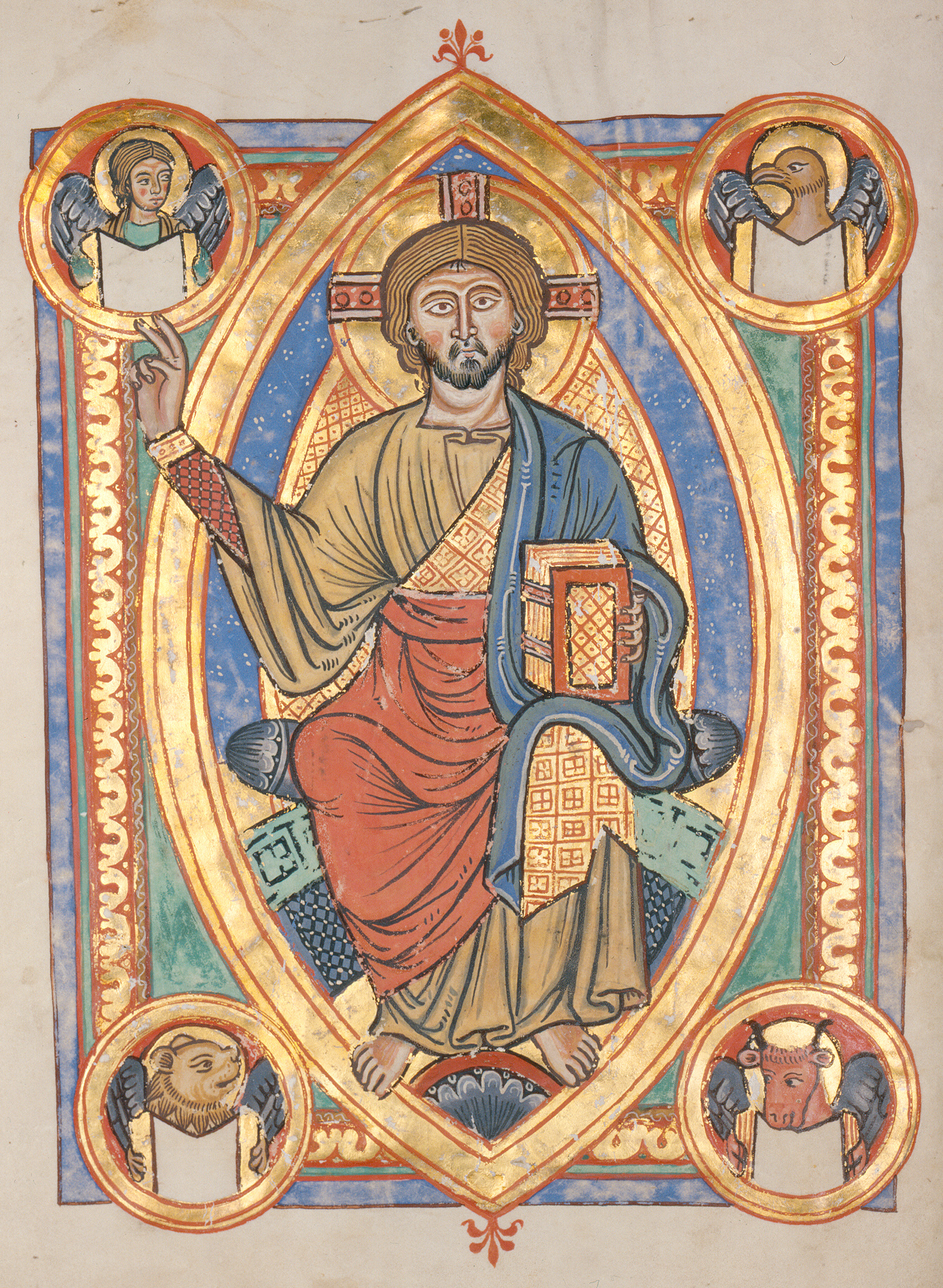
Christ in Majesty shown within a mandorla shape in a medieval illuminated manuscript

A mandorla is a vesica piscis shaped aureola which surrounds the figures of Christ and the Virgin Mary in traditional Christian art. It is commonly used to frame the figure of Christ in Majesty in early medieval and Romanesque art, as well as Byzantine art of the same periods. The term refers to the almond like shape: "mandorla" means almond nut in Italian. In icons of the Eastern Orthodox Church, the mandorla is used to depict sacred moments which transcend time and space, such as the Resurrection, Transfiguration, and the Ascension. These mandorla will often be painted in several concentric patterns of color which grow darker as they come close to the center. This is in keeping with the church's use of Apophatic theology, as described by Dionysius the Areopagite and others. As holiness increases, there is no way to depict its brightness, except by darkness.

In a famous romanesque fresco of Christ in Glory at Sant Climent de Taüll, the inscription "Ego Sum Lux Mundi" ("I Am the Light of the World") is incorporated in the Mandorla design.

The tympanum at Conques has Christ, with a gesture carved in romanesque sculpture, indicate the angels at his feet bearing candlesticks. Six surrounding stars, resembling blossoming flowers, indicate the known planets including the Moon. Here the symbolism implies Christ as the Sun.

In one special case, at Cervon (Nièvre), Christ is seated surrounded by eight stars, resembling blossoming flowers. At Conques the flowers are six-petalled. At Cervon, where the almond motif is repeated in the rim of the mandorla, they are five-petalled, as are almond flowers -the first flowers to appear at the end of winter, even before the leaves of the almond tree. Here one is tempted to seek for reference in the symbolism of the nine branched Chanukkiyah candelabrum. In the 12th century a great school of Judaic thought radiated from Narbonne, coinciding with the origins of the Kabbalah. Furthermore, at Cervon the eight star/flower only is six petalled: the Root of David, the Morningstar, mentioned at the close of Book of Revelation (22:16) (In one of the oldest manuscripts of the complete Hebrew Bible, the Leningrad Codex, one finds the Star of David imbedded in an octagon.)

In the symbolism of Hildegarde von Bingen the mandorla refers to the Cosmos.

== Aureole (atmospheric phenomenon) ==
In meteorology, an aureole is the inner disk of a corona, an optical phenomenon produced by the diffraction of light from the Sun or the Moon (or, occasionally, other bright light sources) by individual small water droplets and sometimes tiny ice crystals of a cloud or on a foggy glass surface. The aureole is often (especially in case of the Moon) the only visible part of the corona and has the appearance of a bluish-white disk which fades to reddish-brown towards the edge.

== See also ==
- Halo
- Aureole effect
- Crown of Immortality
- Five Crowns
