= Subparhelic circle =

Rare atmospheric optical phenomenon

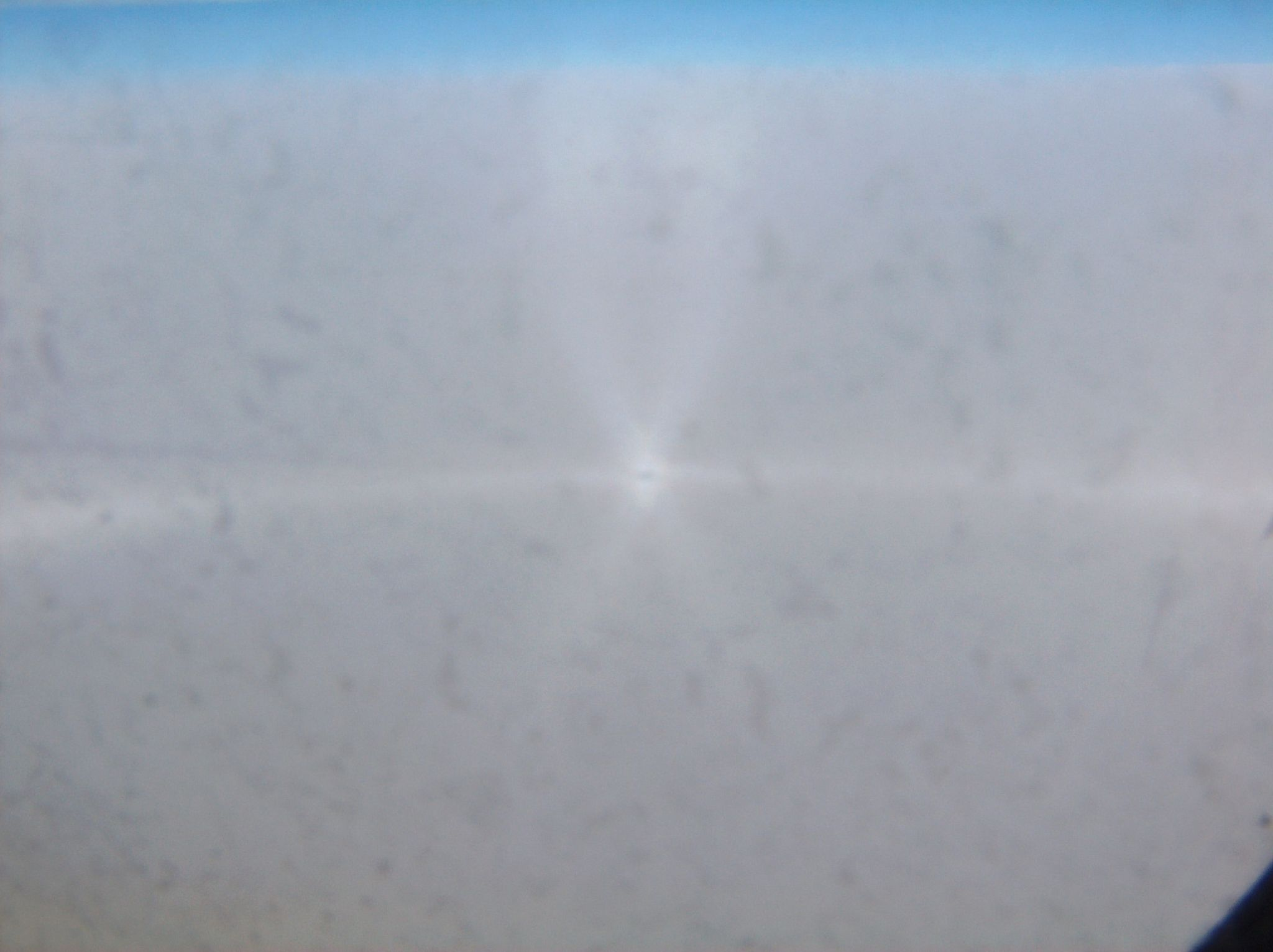
This photo centred at the antisolar point shows various antisolar halos, as seen on a flight from Brussels to Madrid on 7 August 2006. Credit: Francesco De Comité

The subparhelic circle is a rare halo, an optical phenomenon, located below the horizon. It passes through both the subsun (below the Sun) and the antisolar point (opposite to the Sun). The subparhelic circle is the subhorizon counterpart to the parhelic circle, located above the horizon.

Located on the subparhelic circle are several relatively rare optical phenomena: the subsun, the subparhelia, the 120° subparhelia, Liljequist subparhelia, the diffuse arcs, and the Parry antisolar arcs.

On the accompanying photo centred at the antisolar point, the subparhelic circle appears as a gently curved horizontal line intercepted by anthelic arcs.

== See also ==
- 120° parhelion
- Anthelion
