= Sylvanshine =

Optical phenomenon

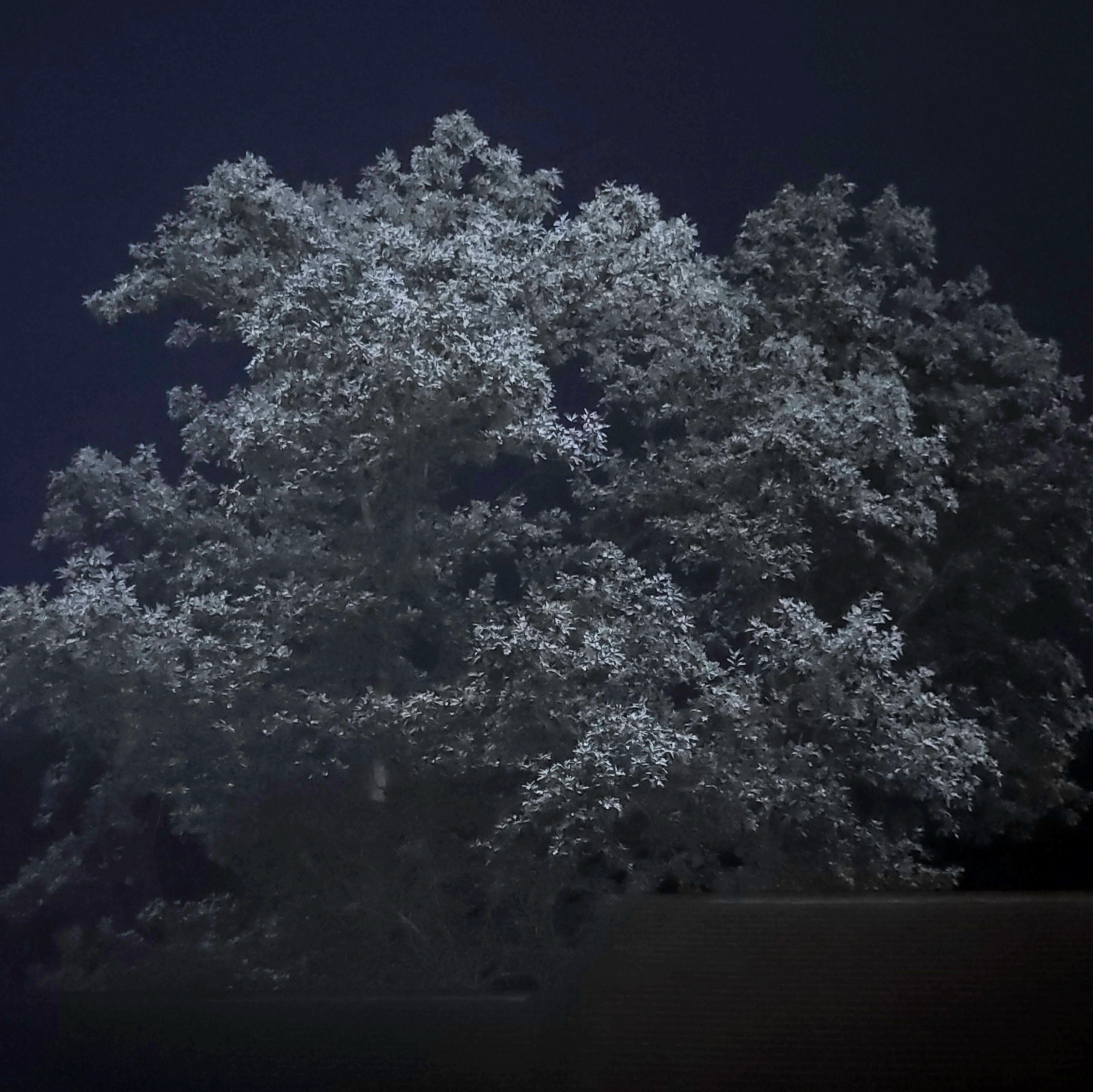
Sylvanshine on dew-covered oak leaves illuminated by a flashlight before sunrise in Pennsylvania.

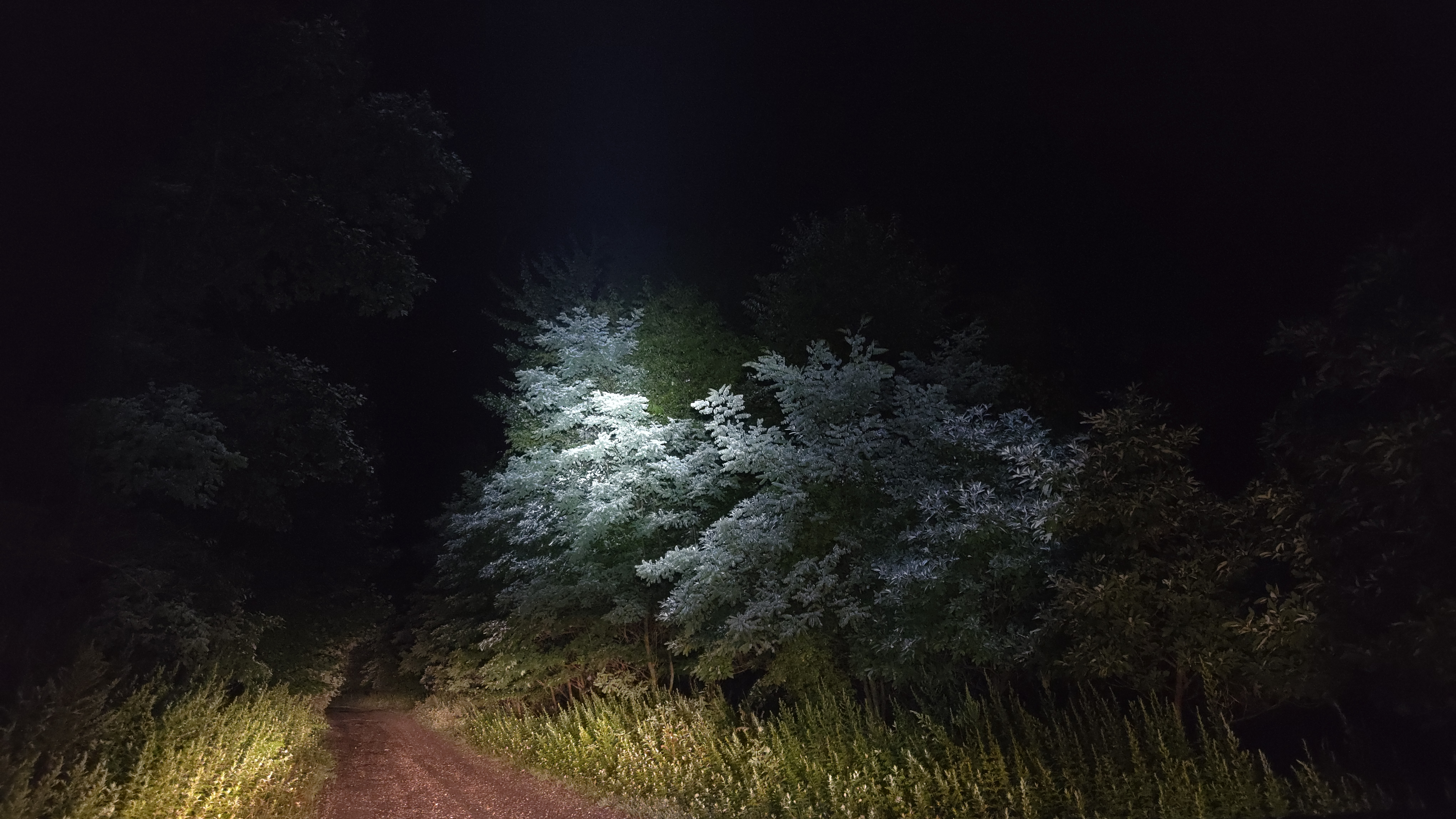
Sylvanshine produced by a spotlight.

Sylvanshine is an optical phenomenon in which dew-covered foliage with wax-coated leaves retroreflect beams of light, as from a vehicle's headlights. This effect sometimes makes trees appear snow-covered at night during summer. The phenomenon was named and explained in 1994 by Alistair Fraser of Pennsylvania State University, an expert in meteorological optics. According to his explanation, the epicuticular wax on the leaves causes water to form beads, which in effect, become lenses. These lenses focus the light to a spot on the leaf surface, and the image of this spot is directed as rays in the opposite direction.
