= 1079 Mimosa =

Main-belt asteroid

Discovery
- Discovered by: G. van Biesbroeck
- Discovery site: Yerkes Obs.
- Discovery date: 14 January 1927

Designations
- Pronunciation: /mɪˈmoʊzə, -sə/
- Named after: Mimosa (flowering plant)
- Alternative designations: 1927 AD · 1961 AM
- Minor planet category: main-belt · (outer); Koronis · Karin

Orbital characteristics
- Epoch 4 September 2017 (JD 2458000.5)
- Uncertainty parameter 0
- Observation arc: 90.80 yr (33,165 days)
- Aphelion: 3.0127 AU
- Perihelion: 2.7332 AU
- Semi-major axis: 2.8729 AU
- Eccentricity: 0.0486
- Orbital period (sidereal): 4.87 yr (1,779 days)
- Mean anomaly: 253.25°
- Mean motion: 0° 12^{m} 8.64^{s} / day
- Inclination: 1.1764°
- Longitude of ascending node: 329.37°
- Argument of perihelion: 106.35°

Physical characteristics
- Dimensions: 19.01±1.20 km 20.67 km (derived); 20.69±2.7 km
- Synodic rotation period: 7.3 h 24 h 64.6±0.5 h
- Geometric albedo: 0.1332 (derived); 0.1367±0.044; 0.174±0.025
- Spectral type: Tholen = S · S B–V = 0.800; U–B = 0.393
- Absolute magnitude (H): 11.1 · 11.18±0.02 · 11.20 · 11.23 · 11.30±0.26

1079 Mimosa, provisional designation 1927 AD, is a stony Karin or Koronian asteroid from the outer regions of the asteroid belt, approximately 20 kilometers in diameter. It was discovered on 14 January 1927, by Belgian–American astronomer George Van Biesbroeck at the Yerkes Observatory in Williams Bay, Wisconsin. The asteroid was named after the flowering plant Mimosa.

== Orbit and classification ==
Based on the Hierarchical Clustering Method, which uses the object's proper orbital elements, Mimosa is a member of the stony Karin family (610), a mid-sized asteroid family named after its parent body 832 Karin. The asteroid has also been grouped into the much larger Koronis family (605).

Mimosa orbits the Sun in the outer asteroid belt at a distance of 2.7–3.0 AU once every 4 years and 10 months (1,779 days; semi-major axis of 2.87 AU). Its orbit has an eccentricity of 0.05 and an inclination of 1° with respect to the ecliptic. The body's observation arc begins with its official discovery observation at Williams Bay in January 1927.

== Physical characteristics ==
In the Tholen classification, Mimosa is a stony S-type asteroid, which matches the overall spectral type of both the Karin and Koronis family. Pan-STARRS' photometric survey also characterized the asteroid as a common S-type.

=== Rotation period ===
Several fragmentary rotational lightcurves of Mimosa have been obtained from photometric observations since 1983. Lightcurve analysis gave a consolidated rotation period of 64.6 hours with a brightness amplitude between 0.07 and 0.13 magnitude (U=2-). While not being a slow rotator, this is a notably longer-than average period as most asteroids take less than 20 hours to complete a full rotation. However, the period is based on a fragmentary lightcurve and still may change significantly. As of 2017, no secure period has been obtained.

=== Diameter and albedo ===
According to the surveys carried out by the Infrared Astronomical Satellite IRAS (PDS IMPS) and the Japanese Akari satellite, Mimosa measures between 19.01 and 20.69 kilometers in diameter and its surface has an albedo between 0.1367 and 0.174. The Collaborative Asteroid Lightcurve Link derives an albedo of 0.1332 and a diameter of 20.67 kilometers based on an absolute magnitude of 11.23.

== Naming ==
This minor planet was named after the flowering plant Mimosa, a genus of herbs and shrubs of the legume family Fabaceae (also see list of minor planets named after animals and plants). The official naming citation was mentioned in The Names of the Minor Planets by Paul Herget in 1955 (H 102).
