= Dust astronomy =

Branch of astronomy

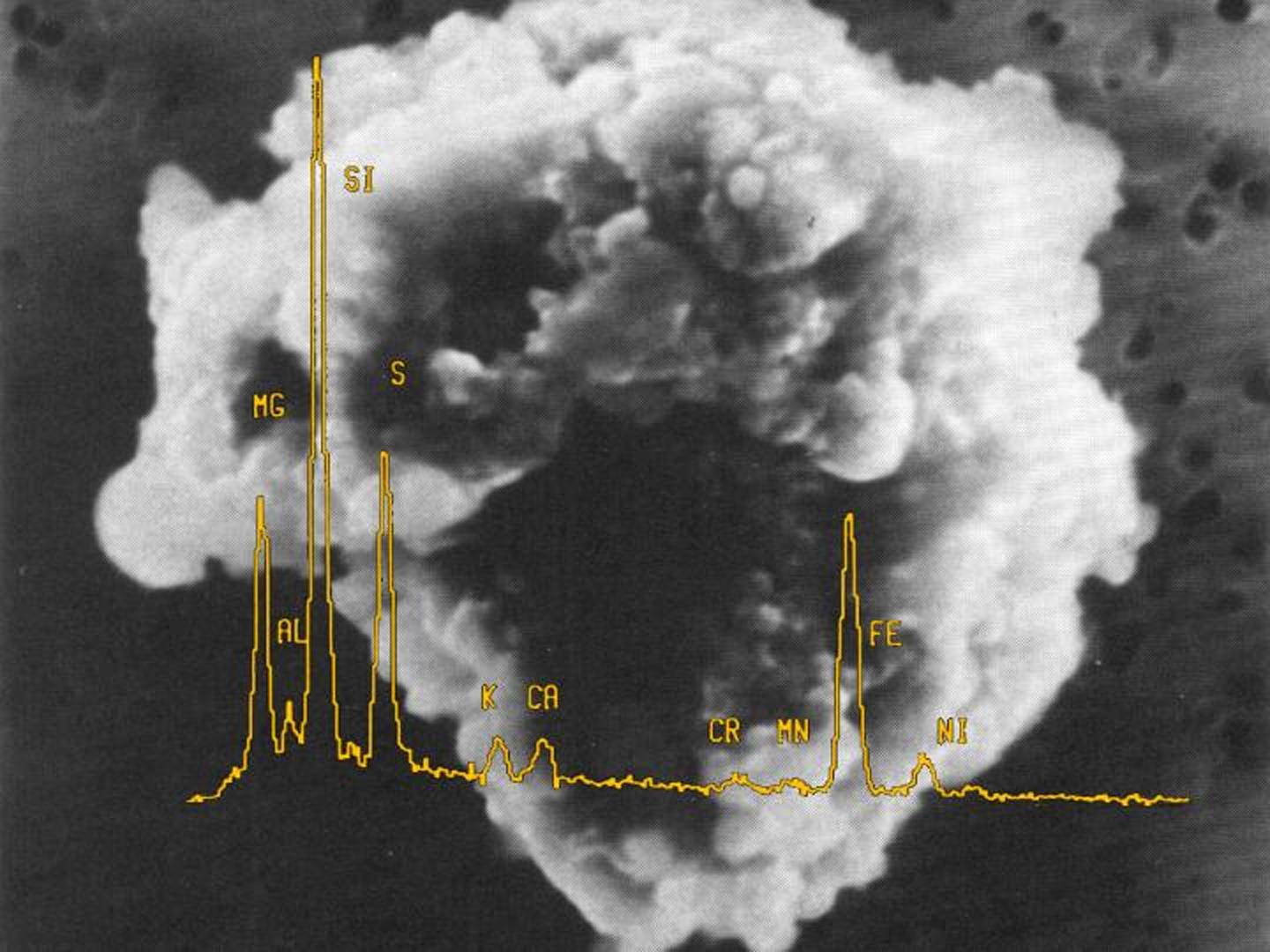
Composite of a scanning electron microscope (SEM) photo of a dust particle collected by NASA in the stratosphere together with its energy-dispersive X-ray spectrum (EDS)

Dust astronomy is a subfield of astronomy that uses the information contained in individual cosmic dust particles ranging from their dynamical state to its isotopic, elemental, molecular, and mineralogical composition in order to obtain information on the astronomical objects occurring in outer space. Dust astronomy overlaps with the fields of Planetary science, Cosmochemistry, and Astrobiology.

Eberhard Grün et al. stated in the 2002 Kuiper prize lecture "Dust particles, like photons, carry information from remote sites in space and time. From knowledge of the dust particles' birthplace and their bulk properties, we can learn about the remote environment out of which the particles were formed. This approach is called Dust Astronomy which is carried out by means of a dust telescope on a dust observatory in space".

== History ==
The interplanetary dust cloud illuminated and visible as zodiacal light, with its parts the false dawn, gegenschein and the rest of its band, which is visually crossed by the Milky Way, in this composite image of the night sky above the northern and southern hemisphere

=== Early observations ===
Three phenomena that relate (we know today) to cosmic dust were noticed by humans for millennia: Zodiacal light, comets, and meteors (cf. Historical comet observations in China). Early astronomers were interested in understanding these phenomena.

Zodiacal light or false dawn can be seen in the western sky after the evening twilight has disappeared, or in the eastern sky just before the morning twilight appears. This phenomenon was investigated by the astronomer Giovanni Domenico Cassini in 1683. He explained Zodiacal light by interplanetary matter (dust) around the Sun according to Hugo Fechtig, Christoph Leinert, and Otto E. Berg in the book Interplanetary Dust. In the past, unexpected appearances of comets were seen as bad omens that signaled disaster and upheaval, as described in the Observational history of comets. However, in 1705, Edmond Halley used Isaac Newton's laws of motion to analyze several earlier cometary sightings. He observed that the comets of 1531, 1607, and 1682 had very similar orbital elements, and he theorized that they were all the same comet. Halley predicted that this comet would return in 1758-59, but he died before it did. The comet, now known as Halley's Comet and officially designated 1P/Halley, ultimately did return on schedule. A meteor, or shooting star is a streak of light caused by a meteoroid entering the Earth's atmosphere at a speed of several tens of kilometers per second, at an altitude of about 100 km. At this speed the meteoroid heats up and leaves a trail of excited atoms and ions which emit light as they de-excite. In some cultures, meteors were thought to be an atmospheric phenomenon, like lightning. While only a few meteors can typically be seen in one hour on a moonless night, during certain times of the year, meteor showers with over 100 meteors per hour can be observed. Italian astronomer Giovanni Schiaparelli concluded in 1866 that the Perseid meteors were fragments of Comet Swift–Tuttle, based on their orbital similarities. The physical relation between the three disparate phenomena was demonstrated by the American astronomer Fred Lawrence Whipple who in the 1950th, proposed the "icy conglomerate" model of comet composition. This model could explain how comets release meteoroids and dust, which in turn feed and maintain the Zodiacal dust cloud.

=== Compositional analyses of extraterrestrial material ===
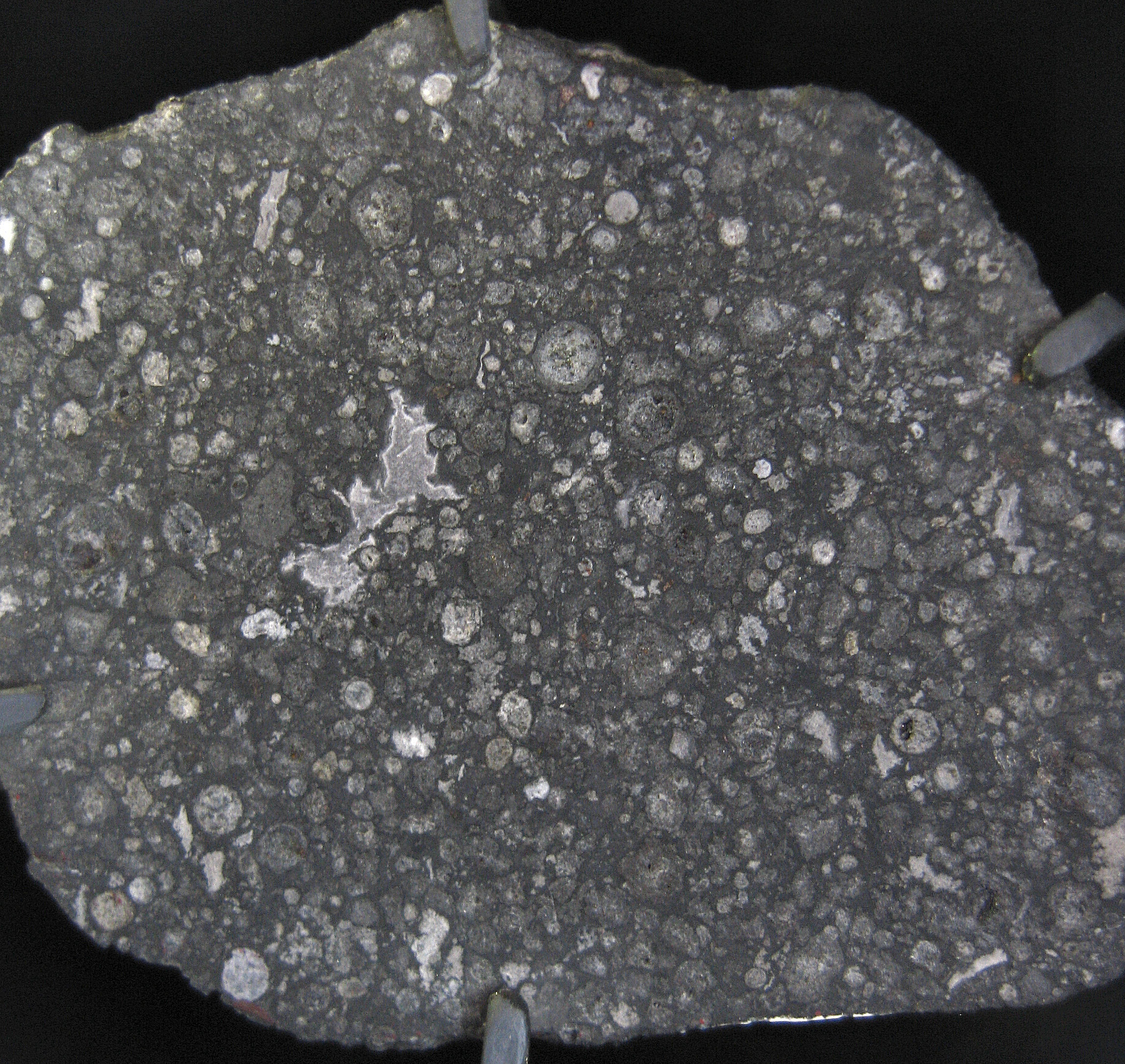
Slice of the Allende meteorite showing circular chondrules

For a long time, the only extraterrestrial material accessible for study were meteorites that had been collected on the Earth's surface. Meteorites were considered solid fragments from other astronomical objects such as planets, asteroids, comets, or moons. Most meteorites are chondrite meteorites that are named for the small, round particles they contain. Carbonaceous chondrites are especially primitive; they have retained many of their chemical properties since they accreted 4.6 billion years ago. Other meteorites have been modified by either melting or planetary differentiation of the parent body. Analyzing the composition of meteorites provides a glimpse into the formation and evolution of the Solar System. Therefore, meteorite analyses have been the cornerstone of cosmochemistry.

The first extraterrestrial samples – other than meteorites – were 380 kg of lunar samples brought back in the seventies by the Apollo missions and at about the same time 300 g were returned by the uncrewed Luna spacecraft. Recently, in 2020 Chang'e 5 collected 1.7 kg of lunar material. From the isotopic, elemental, molecular, and mineralogical compositions important conclusions about e.g. the origin of the Moon like the giant-impact hypothesis were drawn.

Thousands of grains were collected during fly by of comet 81P/Wild by Stardust that returned the samples to Earth in 2006. Their analysis provided insight into the early Solar System. Also some probable interstellar grains were collected during interplanetary cruise of Stardust and were returned by the same mission.

Asteroids and meteorites have been linked via their Asteroid spectral types and similarities in the visible and near-infrared, which implies that asteroids and meteorites derived from the same parent bodies.

The first asteroid samples were collected by the JAXA Hayabusa missions. Hayabusa encountered asteroid 25143 Itokawa in November 2005, picked up 10 to 100 micron sized particles from the surface, and returned them to Earth in June 2010. Hayabusa 2 mission collected about 5 g surface and sub-surface material from asteroid 162173 Ryugu a primitive C-type asteroid and returned it in 2020.

Sample return missions are very expensive and can address only a small number of astronomical objects. Therefore, less expensive methods to collect and analyse extraterrestrial materials have been looked for. Cosmic dust surviving atmospheric entry can be collected by high (~20 km) flying aircraft. Donald E. Brownlee identified reliably the extraterrestrial nature of such collected dust particles by their chondritic composition. A large portion of the collected particles may have a cometary origin while others come from asteroids. These stratospheric dust samples can be requested for further research from a catalogue that provides SEM photos together with their EDS spectra.

== Methods ==
Since the beginning of Space Age the study of space dust rapidly expanded. Freed from peeking through narrow infrared windows in the atmosphere infrared astronomy mapped out cold and dark dust clouds everywhere in the universe. Also, in situ detection and analysis of cosmic dust came in the focus of space agencies (cf. Space dust measurement).

=== In situ dust analyzers ===
Numerous spacecraft have detected micron-sized cosmic dust particles across the Solar System. Some of these spacecraft had dust composition analyzers that used impact ionization to determine the composition of ions generated from the cosmic dust particle. Already the first dust composition analyzer, the Helios Micrometeoroid Analyzer, searched for variations of the compositional and physical properties of micrometeoroids. The spectra did not demonstrate any clustering of single minerals. The continuous transition from low to high ion masses indicates that individual grains are a mixture of various minerals and carbonaceous compounds. The more advanced dust mass analyzers on the 1986 comet Halley missions Vega 1, Vega 2, and Giotto recorded an abundance of small particles. In addition to silicates, many of these particles were rich in light elements such as H, C, N, and O. This indicates that Halley dust is even more primitive than carbonaceous chondrites. The identification of organic constituents suggests that the majority of the particles consist of a predominantly chondritic core with a refractory organic mantle.

Schematics of the Cosmic Dust Analyzer (CDA) and generated signals

The Cassini Cosmic Dust Analyzer (CDA) analyzed dust throughout its interplanetary cruise to Saturn and within the Saturn system. During Cassini's flyby of Jupiter CDA detected several 100 dust impacts within 100 million km from Jupiter. The spectra of these particles revealed sodium chloride (NaCl) as the major particle constituent, along with sulphurous and potassium-bearing components that demonstrated their relation to Jupiter's volcanic moon, Io. Saturn's E ring particles consist predominantly of water ice but in the vicinity of Saturn's moon Enceladus CDA found mostly salt-rich ice particles that were ejected by active ice geysers on the surface of this moon. This finding led to the belief that an underground salt-water ocean is the source for all matter observed in the plumes. At large distance from Saturn CDA identified and analyzed interstellar grains passing through the Saturn system. These analyses suggested magnesium-rich grains of silicate and oxide composition, some with iron inclusions.

The detection of electric dust charges by CDA provided means for contact-free detection and analysis of dust grains in space. This discovery led to the development of a trajectory sensor that allows us to determine the trajectory of a charged dust particle prior to impact onto an impact target. Such a dust trajectory sensor can be combined with an aerogel dust collector in order to form an active dust collector or with a large-area dust composition analyzer in order to form a dust telescope With its capabilities CDA can be considered a prototype dust telescope.

=== Dust telescopes ===
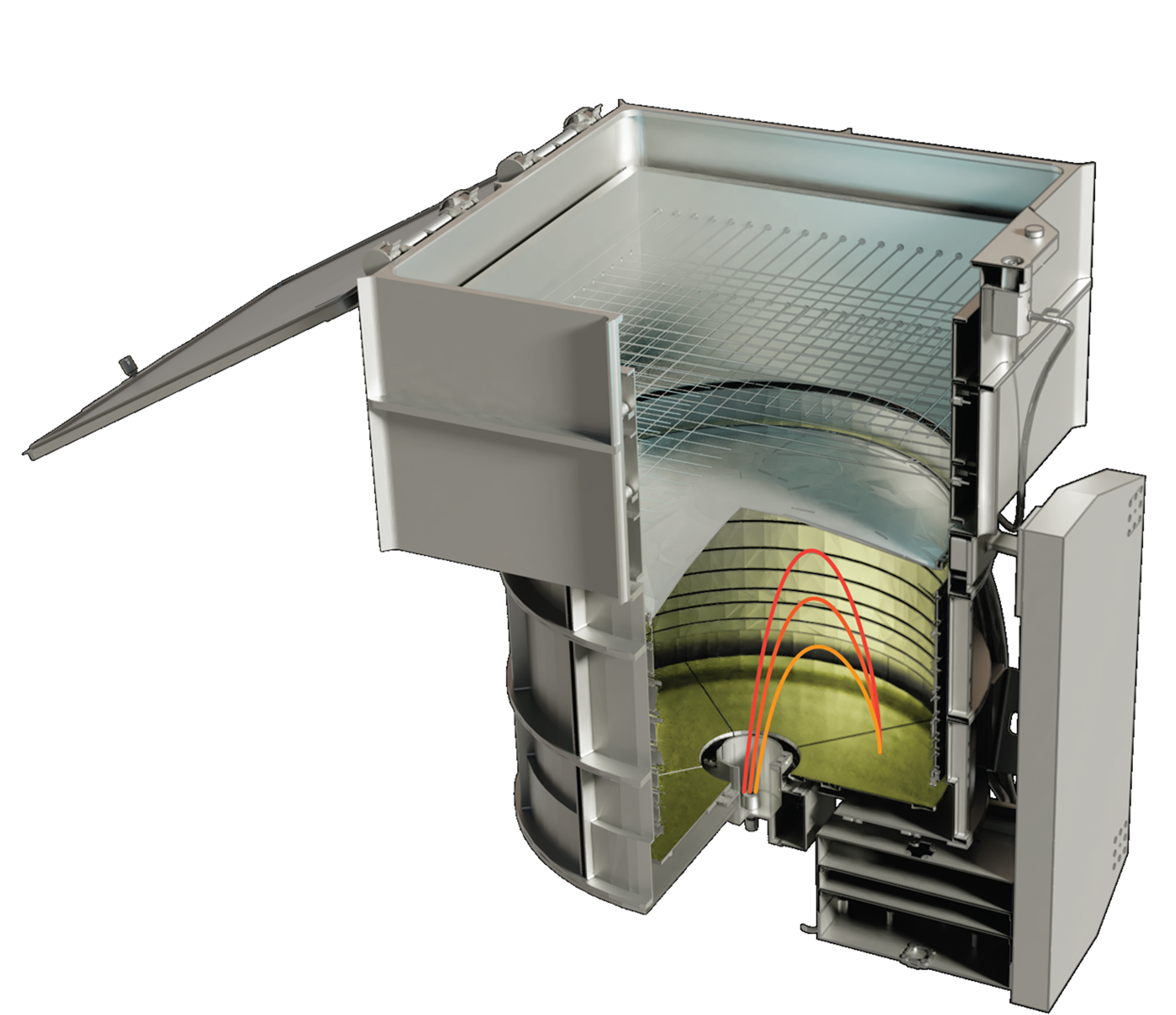
Prototype of a Dust Telescope consisting of a Dust Trajectory Sensor (top part) and a Dust Composition Analyzer (lower part).

In situ methods of dust astronomy like dust composition analyzers aim for the exploitation of the cosmochemical information contained in individual cosmic dust particles. Not so costly as sample return missions are rendezvous missions to a comet or asteroid like the Rosetta space probe to comet 67P/Churyumov–Gerasimenko. Rosetta characterized collected comet dust by sophisticated dust analyzers like the dust detector GIADA, a high-resolution secondary ion mass spectrometer COSIMA, an atomic force microscope MIDAS, and the mass spectrometers of ROSINA.

Several large-area dust composition analyzers and dust telescopes are in preparation in order to study astronomical objects or interplanetary dust from comets and asteroids and interstellar dust.

The Surface Dust Analyser (SUDA) on board the Europa Clipper mission will map the composition of Europa's surface and search for cryovolcanic plumes. The instrument is capable of identifying biosignatures and other complex molecules in ice ejecta.

The DESTINY+ Dust Analyzer (DDA) will fly on the Japanese-German space mission DESTINY+ to asteroid 3200 Phaethon. Phaethon is the parent object of the December Geminids meteor stream. DDA's will study Phaeton's dust environment during the encounter and will analyze interstellar and interplanetary dust on cruise to Phaethon

The Interstellar Dust Experiment (IDEX) will fly on the Interstellar Mapping and Acceleration Probe (IMAP) at the Sun–Earth L1 Lagrange point. IDEX will provide the mass distribution and elemental composition of interstellar and interplanetary dust particles.

== Sources of cosmic dust ==
The ultimate source of cosmic dust are stars in which the elements – out of which stardust is composed of – are produced by fusion of hydrogen and helium or by explosive nucleosynthesis in supernovae. This stardust from various stellar sources is mixed in the interstellar medium and thermally processed in star forming regions. Solar System objects like comets and asteroids contain this material in more or less further processed form. Geologically active satellites like Io or Enceladus emit dust that condensed out of vapor from the molten interior of these planetary bodies.

=== Stars ===
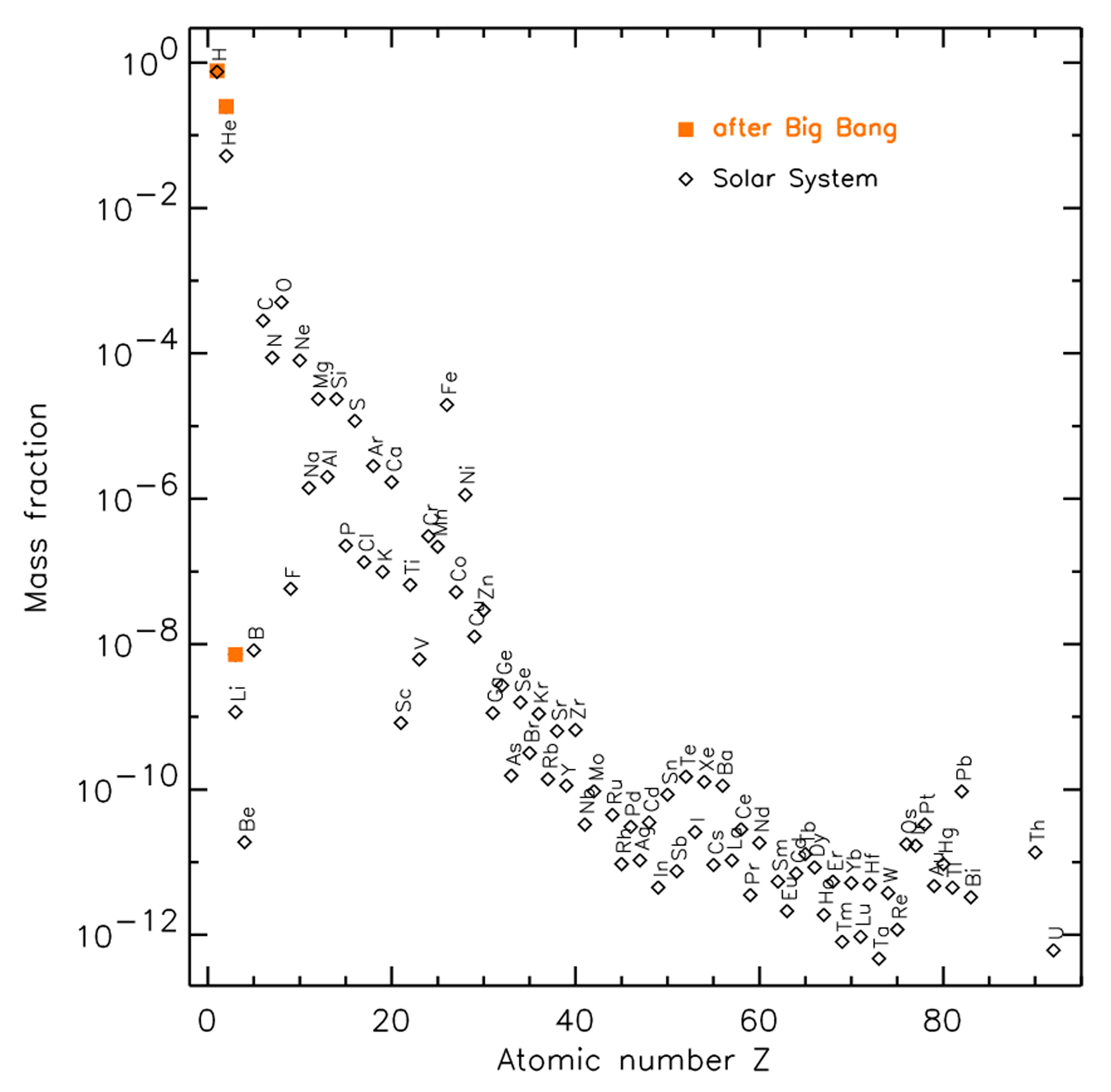
Abundance of the chemical elements after the Big Bang and in the Solar System. All elements heavier than lithium (Li) have been formed in supernovae and stars.

After the Big Bang existed only the chemical elements Hydrogen, Helium, and Lithium. All other elements we know and that can be found in cosmic dust have been formed in Supernovae and stars. Therefore, the ultimate sources of dust are stars. Elements from carbon (atomic number Z = 6) to plutonium (Z = 94) are produced by nucleosynthesis in stellar cores and in Supernova explosions. Stellar nucleosynthesis in the most massive stars creates many elements, with the abundance peak at iron (Z = 26) and nickel (Z = 28). Stellar evolution depends strongly on mass of the star. Star masses range from ~0.1 to ~100 solar masses. Their lifetimes range from 10^{6} years for the biggest stars to 10^{12} years for the smallest stars. Towards the end of their life mature stars may expand into red giants with dense stellar winds forming circumstellar envelopes in which molecules and dust particles can form. More massive stars shed their outer shells while their cores collapse into neutron stars or black holes. The elemental, isotopic, and mineralogical composition of all this stardust reflects the composition of the outer shell of the corresponding parent star.

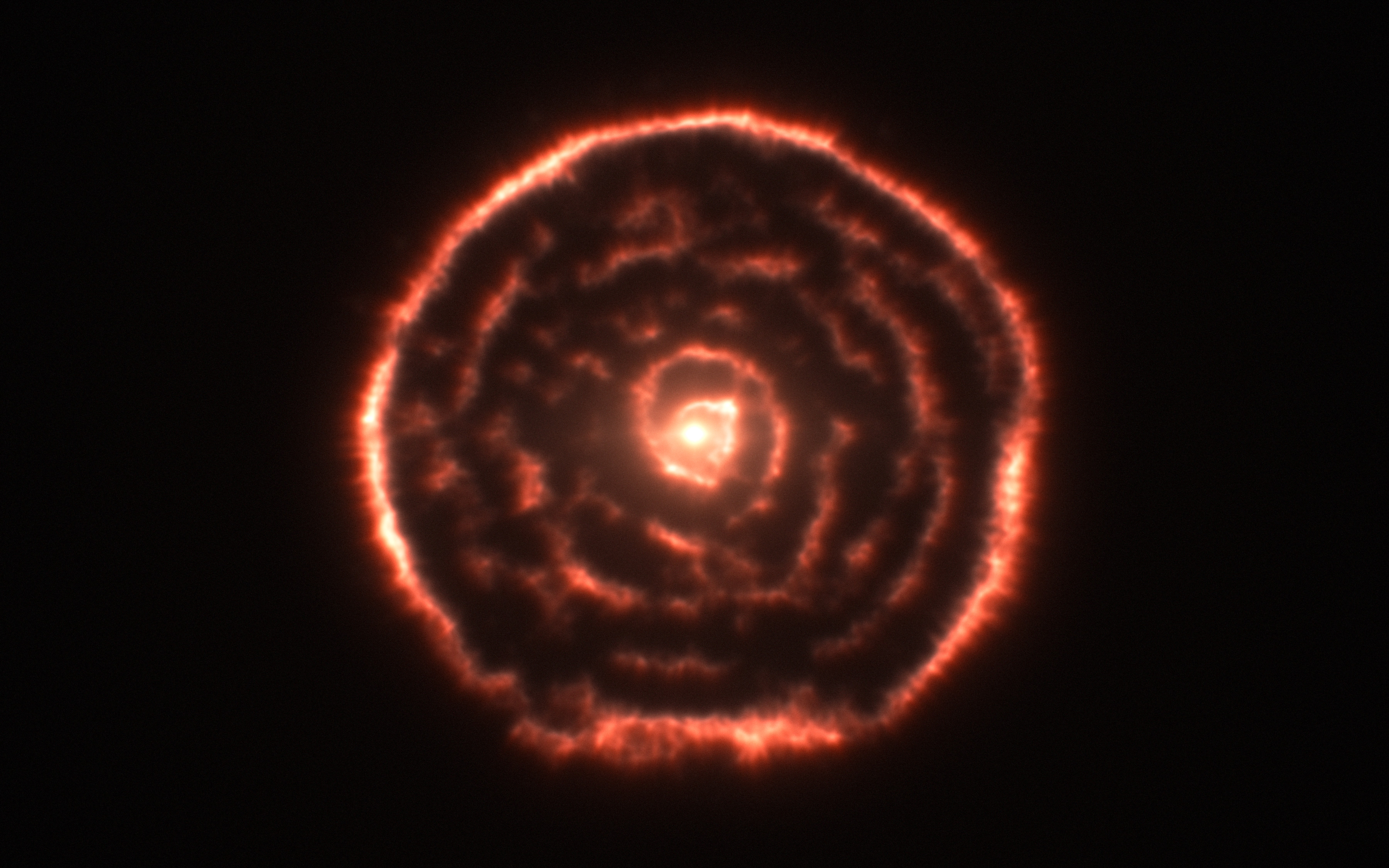
Gas and dust shells around the carbon star R Sculptoris observed by ALMA and the ESO 3.6 m Telescope

Already in 1860 Angelo Secchi identified carbon stars as a separate class of stars. Carbon stars are characterized by their dominant spectral Swan bands from the molecule C_{2} and their ruby red colour caused by soot-like substances. Also silicon carbide has been observed in the outflows of carbon stars. Since the advent of infrared astronomy dust in stellar outflows became observable. Bands at 10 and 18 microns wavelength were observed around many late-type giant stars indicating the presence of silicate dust in circumstellar envelopes. Oxides of the metals Al, Mg, Fe and others are suspected to be emitted from oxygen-rich stars. Dust is observed in Supernova remnants like the Crab Nebula and in contemporary Supernovae explosions These observations indicate that most dust in the interstellar medium is created by Supernovae.

Traces of star dust have been found in presolar grains contained in meteorites. Star dust grains are identified by their unique isotopic composition that is different from that in the Solar System's matter as well as from the galactic average. Presolar grains formed within outflowing and cooling gases from earlier presolar stars and have an isotopic composition unique to that parent star. These isotopic signatures are often fingerprints of very specific astrophysical nuclear reactions that took place within the parent star. Unusual isotopic signatures of neon and xenon have been found in extraterrestrial diamond grains and silicon carbide grains. The silicon isotopes within the SiC grains have isotopic ratios like those expected in red-giant stars. Some presolar grains are composed primarily of ^{44}Ca which is presumably the remains of the extinct radionuclide ^{44}Ti, a titanium isotope that was formed in abundance in Type II supernovae.

=== Interstellar medium and star formation regions ===
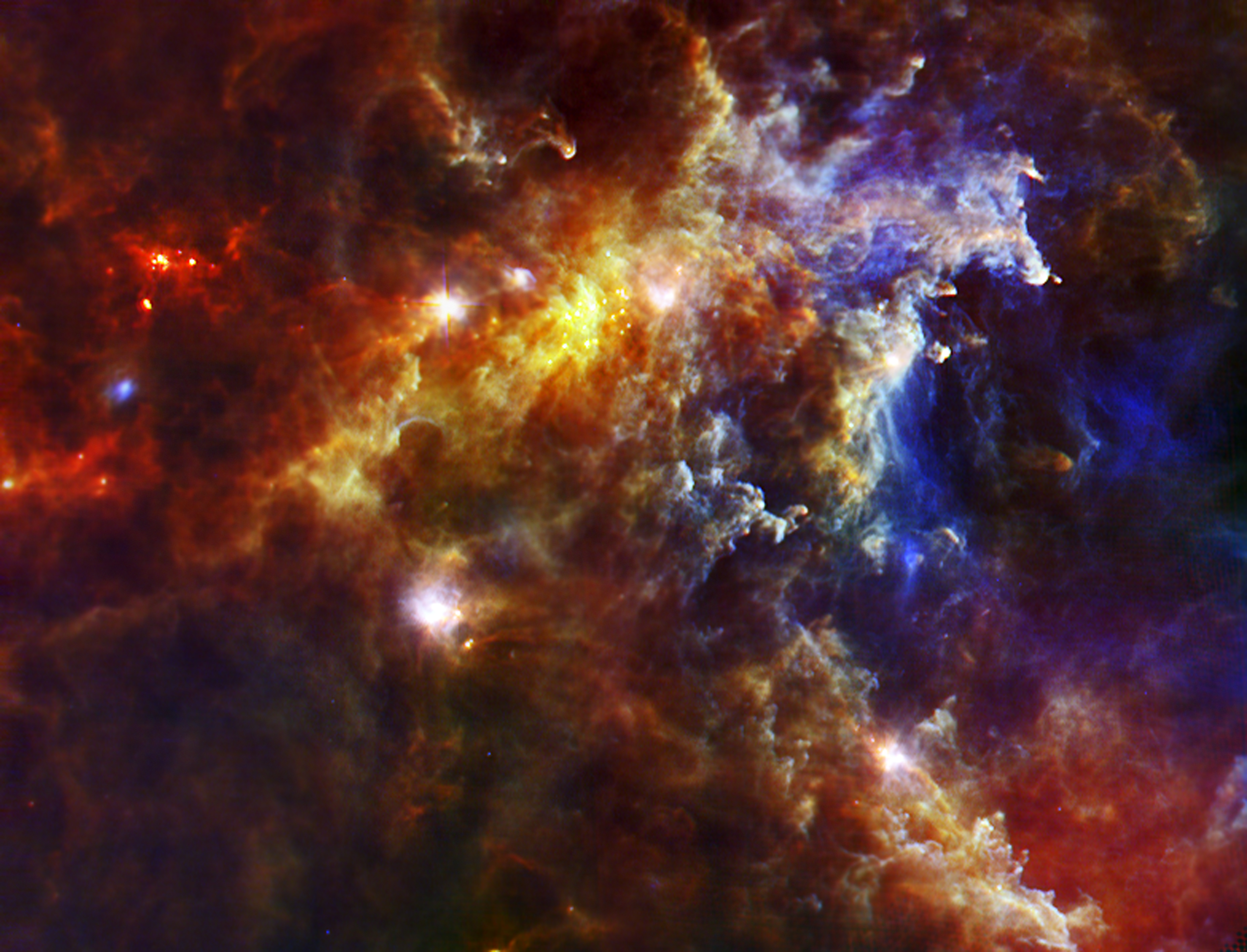
Composite infrared image (wavelengths: 250, 160, 70 microns) of part of the Rosette Nebula recorded by the Herschel Space Observatory. The bright patches are massive (~10 solar masses) protostars, the small spots are lower mass globules containing protostars

The interstellar medium is a melting pot of gas and dust emitted from stars. The composition of the interstellar medium is the result of nucleosynthesis in stars since the Big Bang and is represented by the abundance of the chemical elements. It consists of three phases: (1) dense, cold, and dusty Dark nebulas, (2) diffuse clouds, and (3) hot coronal gas. Dark nebula are Molecular clouds that contain molecular hydrogen and other molecules that have formed in gas phase and on dust grain surfaces. Any gas atom or molecule that hits a cold dust grain will be adsorbed and may recombine with other adsorbed atoms or molecules or with molecules of the dust grain or may just be deposited at the grain surface. Diffuse clouds are warm, neutral, or ionized envelopes of molecular clouds. Both are observable in the galactic disk. Hot coronal gas is heated by supernova explosions and energetic stellar winds. This environment is destructive for molecules and small dust particles and extends into the galactic corona.

In the Milky Way cold dark nebula are concentrated in spiral arms and around the Galactic Center. Dark nebulae are dark because naked interstellar dust or dust covered with condensed gases absorb visible light by extinction and remit infrared and submillimetre radiation. Infrared emission from the dust cools the clouds down to 10 to 20 K. The largest dark nebula are giant molecular clouds that contain 10 thousand to 10 million solar masses and are 5 to 200 parsecs (pc) in size. The smallest are Bok globules of a few to 50 solar masses and ~1 pc across.

When a dense cloud becomes cold enough and the gas pressure is insufficient to support it, the cloud will undergo gravitational collapse and fragments into smaller clouds of about stellar mass. Such star formation will result in a gravitationally bound open cluster of stars or an unbound stellar association. In each collapsing cloud gas and dust is drawn inward toward the center of gravity. The heat generated by the collapse in a protostellar cloud will heat up an accretion disk that feeds the central protostar. The most massive stars evolve fast into luminous O and B stars that ultimately disperse the surrounding gas and dust by radiation pressure and strong stellar winds into the diffuse interstellar medium.

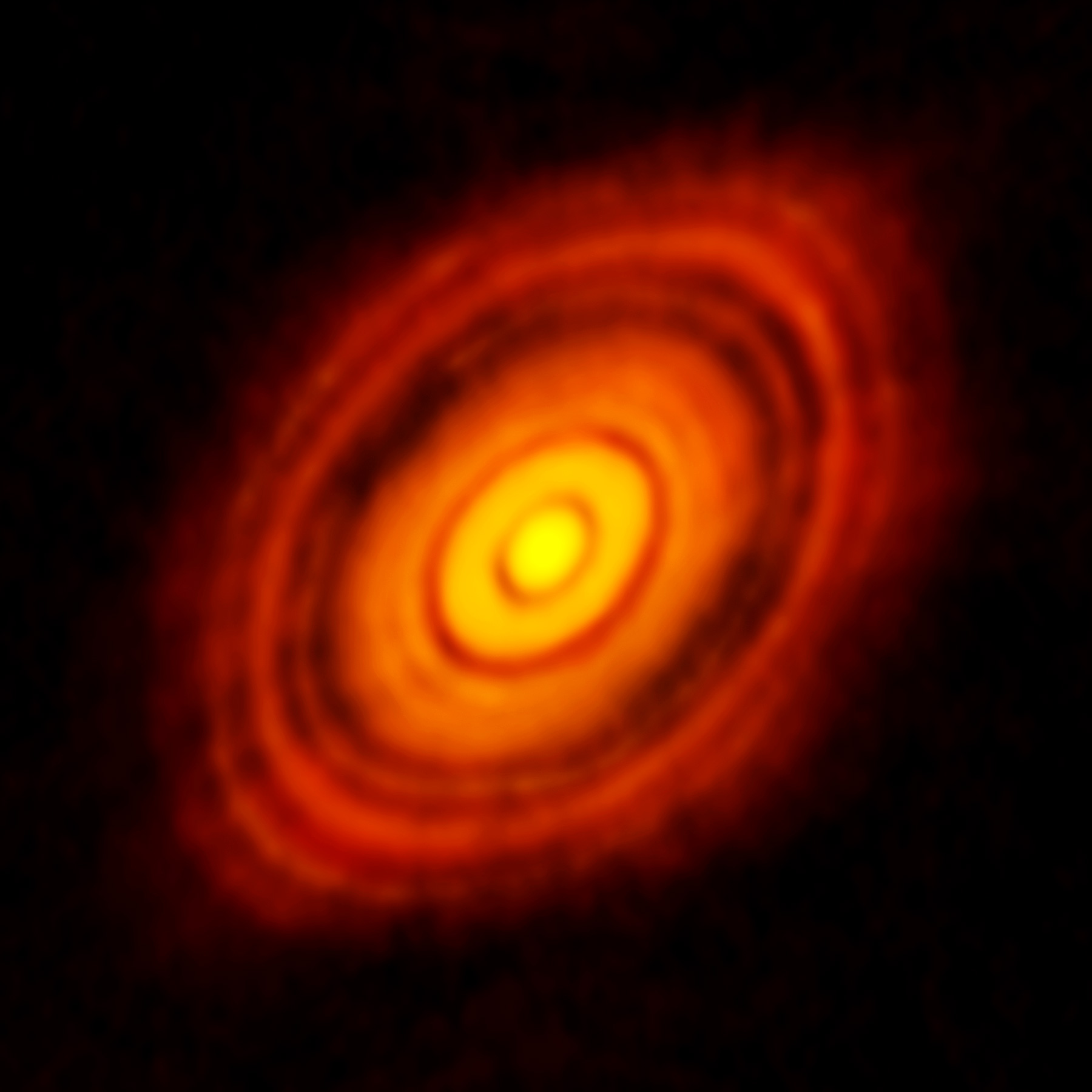
ALMA image of the protoplanetary disc around HL Tauri

Solar mass-type stars take more time and develop a protoplanetary disk consisting of gas and dust with strong radial density and temperature gradients; with highest values close to the central protostar. At temperatures below 1300 K fine-grained minerals condensed from the hot gas; like the calcium–aluminium-rich inclusions found in carbonaceous chondrite meteorites. There is another important temperature limit in the protoplanetary disk at ~150 K, the snow line; outside which it is cold enough for volatile compounds such as water, ammonia, methane, carbon dioxide, carbon monoxide, and nitrogen to condense into solid ice grains. Inside the snow line the terrestrial planets have formed; outside of which the gas giants and their icy moons have formed.

In the protoplanetary disk dust and gas evolve to planets in three phases. In the first phase micron-sized dust is carried by the gas and collisions between dust particles occur by Brownian motion at low speed. Through ballistic agglomeration dust (and ice) grains grow to cm-sized aggregates. In the second phase cm-sized pebbles grow to km-sized planetesimals. (cf. section on Dust accretion). It comprises the formation of chondrules in the region of the terrestrial planets. Theories of chondrule formation include solar nebula lightning; nebular shocks, and meteoroid collisions. In this phase dust decouples from the gas and move on Kepler orbits around the central protostar slowly settling near the middle plane of the disk. In this dense layer particles can grow by gravitational instability and streaming instability to km-sized planetesimals. The third phase is the runaway accretion of planetesimals by self-gravitation to form planetary embryos that eventually merge into planets.

During this planet formation stage the central star becomes a T Tauri star at which it is powered by gravitational energy released as the star contracts until hydrogen fusion begins. T Tauri stars have extremely powerful stellar winds that clear the remaining gas and dust form the protoplanetary disk and the growth of planetary objects stops.

=== Local interstellar medium ===
The Sun's location near the edge of the Local Interstellar Cloud and Alpha Centauri about 1.3 pc away in the neighboring G-Cloud

The Sun is located 8,300 pc from the center of the galaxy on the inner edge of the Orion Arm within the diffuse Local Interstellar Cloud (LIC) of the Local Bubble. The Local Bubble was created by supernovae explosions in the nearest (~130 pc) star formation region of the Scorpius–Centaurus association. Several partially ionized warm "clouds" of interstellar gas are located within a few parsecs of the Sun. Their hydrogen density is about 5 times higher than that of the Local Bubble. For the last several ten thousand years the Sun passed through the LIC but within a few 1000 years the Sun will enter the nearby G cloud. Interstellar dust grains smaller than 10 microns couple to the LIC gas via the interstellar magnetic field over a scale length <1 pc. The LIC is a warm tenuous partially ionized cloud (T ≈ 7000 K, n_{H} + n_{H^{+}} ≈ 0.3 cm^{−3}) surrounding the Solar System. It streams at ≈ 26 km/s around the Solar System.

The heliopause is 100 to 150 AU from the Sun in the upstream direction that separates the interstellar medium from the heliosphere. Only neutral atoms and dust particles >0.1 micron can penetrate the heliopause and enter the heliosphere. The Ulysses instruments GAS and DUST discovered flows of interstellar helium and interstellar dust particles passing through the inner Solar System. Both flow directions in the ecliptic coordinate system are very similar at ecliptic longitude l ≈ 74°, ecliptic latitude b ≈ -5°. Ulysses monitored the dust flow over 16 years and found a strong variation with the solar cycle that is due to the variations in the interplanetary magnetic field which followed the 22-year solar dynamo cycle. The first compositional analyses of interstellar dust particles are available from the Cassini Cosmic Dust Analyzer and the interstellar dust collection by the Stardust mission. The moderate resolution spectra of interstellar dust suggest magnesium-rich grains of silicate and oxide composition, some with iron inclusions. Future high mass resolution dust telescope analyses will provide a sharper view on the composition of interstellar dust. Samples from the Stardust mission found seven probable interstellar grains; their detailed investigation is ongoing. Future collections with an active dust collector may improve the quality and quantity of interstellar dust collections.

=== Trans-Neptunian objects and comets ===
Schematic distribution of small Solar System objects. In the center are the Sun, the planets and the Kuiper belt that extends into the scattered disc and the spherical shell of the Oort cloud

Trans-Neptunian objects, TNOs, are small Solar System bodies and dwarf planets that orbit the Sun at greater average distances than Neptune's orbit at 30 AU. They include Kuiper belt and scattered disc objects and Oort cloud comets. These icy planetesimals and dwarf planets orbit the Sun inside and beyond the heliosphere in the interstellar medium at distances out to ~100,000 AU. In order to explain the number of observed short period comets Fernández proposed a comet belt outside Neptune's orbit that led to the subsequent discovery of many TNOs and, especially, Kuiper belt objects.

The Kuiper belt extends between Neptune's orbit at 35 AU and ~55 AU. The most massive classical Kuiper belt objects have semi-major axis between 39 AU and 48 AU corresponding to the 2:3 and 1:2 resonances with Neptune. The Kuiper belt is thought to consist of planetesimals and dwarf planets from the original protoplanetary disc in which the orbits of Kuiper belt objects have been strongly influenced by Jupiter and Neptune. Mutual collisions in today's Kuiper belt generate dust that has been observed by the Venetia Burney Student Dust Counter on the New Horizons space probe. By the action of Pointing-Robertson drag and planetary scattering this dust can reach within 10^{7} to 10^{8} years the inner planetary system.

The sparsely populated scattered disk extends beyond the Kuiper belt out to ~100 AU. Scattered disk objects are still close enough to Neptune to be perturbed by Neptune's gravitation. This interaction can send them outward into the Oort cloud or inward into the Centaur population. The scattered disc is believed to be the source region of the centaurs and the short-period comets observed in the inner planetary system.

The hypothesized Oort cloud is thought to be a spherical cloud of icy bodies extending from outside the Kuiper belt and the scattered disk to halfway to the nearest star. During planet formation interactions of protoplanetary disk objects with the already developed Jupiter and Neptune resulted in the scattered disc and the Oort cloud. While the Sun was in its birth cluster it may have shared comets from the outskirts protoplanetary discs of other stars. In the scattering processes during planet formation many planetesimals may have become unbound to solar gravitation and became interstellar objects just like ʻOumuamua the first interstellar object detected passing through the Solar System. From the Oort cloud long-period comets are disturbed towards the Sun by gravitational perturbations caused by passing stars. Long-period comets have highly eccentric orbits and periods ranging from 200 years to millions of years and their orbital inclination is roughly isotropic. Most comets (several thousands) observed by ground-based observers or automated observatories (e.g. Pan-STARRS) or by near-Earth spacecraft (e.g. SOHO) are long-period comets that had only one apparition. Comet Halley and other Halley type comets (HTCs) have periods of 20 to 200 years and inclinations from 0 to 180 degrees. HTCs are believed to derive from long-period comets.

Once a Kuiper belt or scattered disk object is scattered by Neptune into an orbit with a perihelion distance well inside Neptune's orbit its orbit becomes unstable because it will eventually cross the orbits of one or more of the giant planets. Such objects are called Centaurs. Centaur orbits have dynamic lifetimes of only a few million years. Some centaur orbits will evolve into Jupiter-crossing orbits and become Jupiter family comets, or collide with the Sun or a planet, or they may be ejected into interstellar space. Centaurs like 2060 Chiron and 29P/Schwassmann–Wachmann display comet-like dust comas. During their inward migration the top layers (~100 m) of the comet's surface heat up and lose much of the volatile ices CO, N_{2}). CO_{2}-ice sublimates at about Jupiter distance (e.g. 29P/Schwassmann–Wachmann).

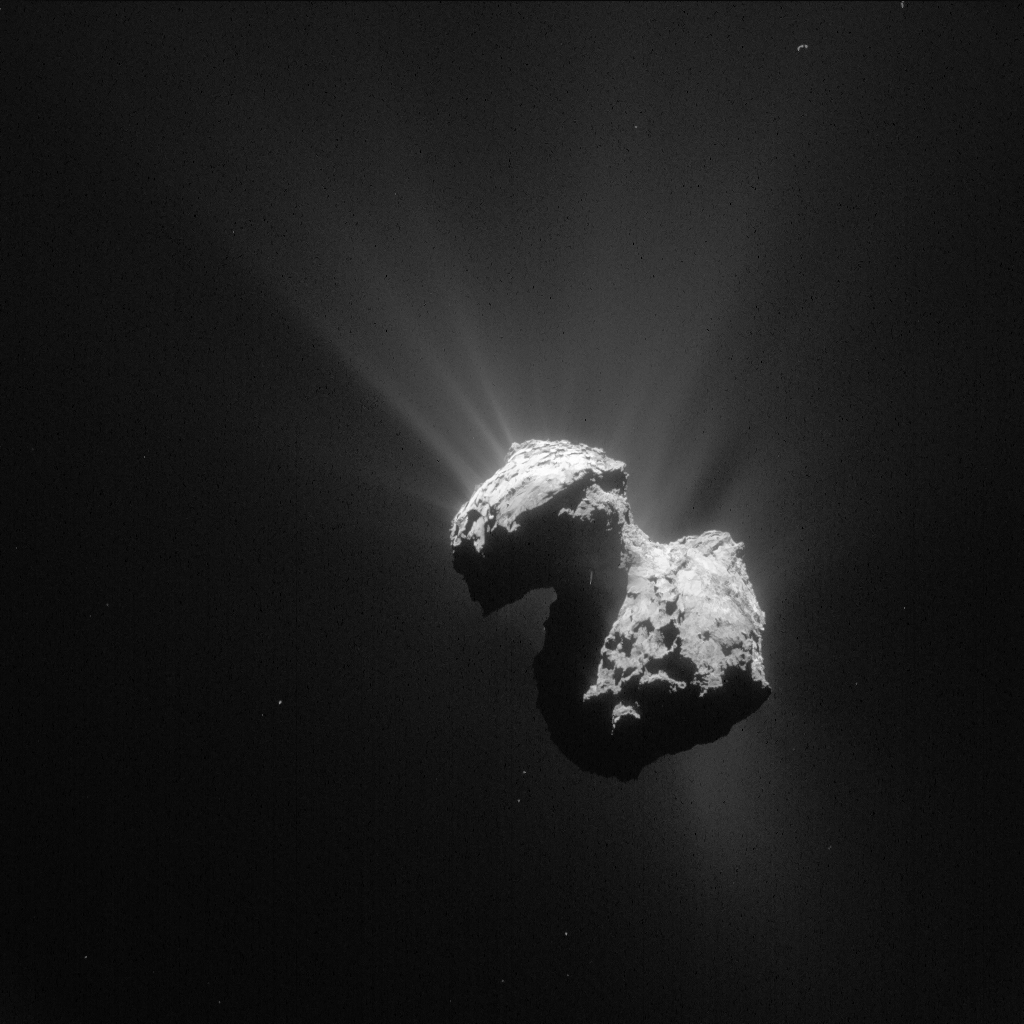
Comet 67P/Churyumov–Gerasimenko in 7 July 2015 as seen by Rosetta's navigation camera when the comet was at 1.9 AU from the Sun

Most periodic comets are Jupiter-family comets (JFCs) that have orbital periods less than 12 years and aphelia close to Jupiter. JFCs originate from Centaurs. Inside three AU distance from the Sun water ice sublimation becomes the dominant driver of activity but also other volatile ices like CO_{2} ice play an important role in cometary activity. The sublimated gases carry micron-sized dust grains to form an observable coma and tail during their perihelion passage. Infrared observations show that many JFCs exhibit a debris trail of up to cm-sized particles along the comet's orbit. When the Earth passes through a comet trail a meteor shower is observed.

The dynamical lifetimes of JFCs is few 10^{5} years before they are eliminated from the Solar System by Jupiter or they collide with a planet or the Sun. However, their active lifetimes are ~10 time shorter because volatile ices vanished from the upper surface layers. They may reawaken again, e.g. when their orbits become much closer to the Sun. Comet Encke is such a case. Its orbit is decoupled from Jupiter; its aphelion distance is only 4.1 AU. It must have been dormant for long time until it reached its present orbit.

As of 2022 eight comets have been visited by spacecraft with remote sensing and fields and particles instrumentation but only for comets 1P/Halley, 81P/Wild 2 and 67P/Churyumov–Gerasimenko additional compositional analyses were obtained from dust composition analyzers. Close range measurements of dust from 1P/Comet Halley by the PIA and PUMA dust analyzers onboard the Giotto and Vega spacecraft showed that dust particles had mostly chondritic composition but were rich in light elements such as H, C, N and O. The Stardust cometary samples were a mix of different components that included presolar grains like SiC grains and high temperature solar nebula condensates like calcium–aluminium-rich inclusions (CAIs) found in primitive meteorites.

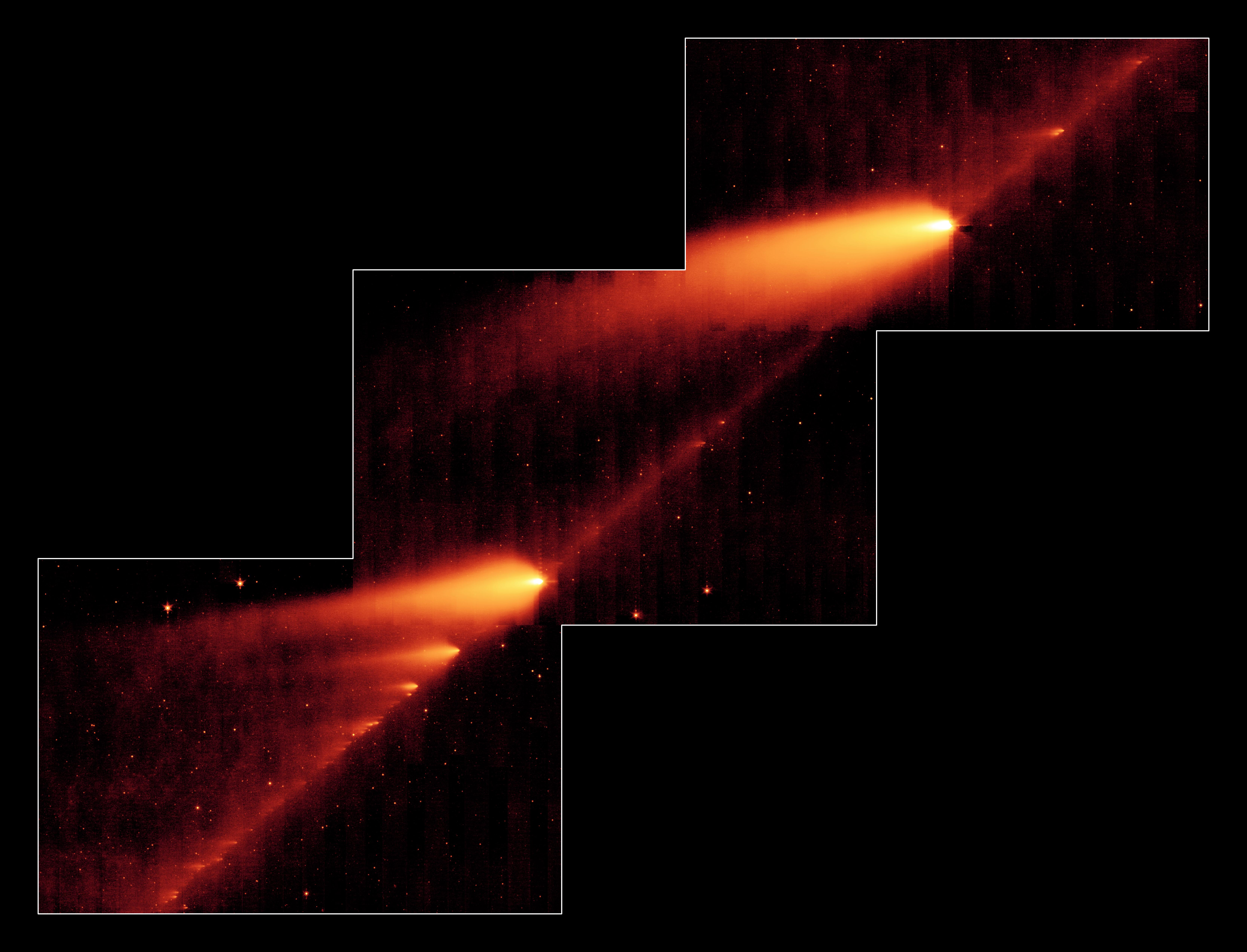
Infrared image from NASA's Spitzer Space Telescope showing the broken comet 73P/Schwassmann-Wachmann 3 that follows the trail of debris left during its multiple trips around the Sun

The COSIMA dust composition analyzers on board Rosetta mission measured the D/H ratio in cometary organics and found that it is between the value on Earth and that in solar-like protostellar regions. The ROSINA gas analyser on Rosetta found that sublimating ice particles are emitted from the active areas on the nucleus. Rosetta observations found that 67P/Churyumov–Gerasimenko has a density of only 540 kg/m^{−3} - much less than any solid material or water ice, therefore, this cometary material is highly porous (~70%). Most of the sub-mm dust particles collected by Rosetta instruments consisted of aggregates of smaller micrometer-sized subunits that may themselves were aggregates of ~100 nm particles. The temperature at a cometary surface is generally near the local blackbody temperature; which suggests the existence of an inactive dust mantle covering large parts of the surface of the nucleus. Therefore, sublimation of ices from the cometary surface and the consequent emission of the embedded dust is not a simple process. The heat from solar illumination has to reach the lower lying ices and the cohesive dust mantle has to be broken. This process has been observed in lab simulations. Large outbursts of gas and dust caused by landslides and even explosions have been observed by Rosetta during its rendezvous with 67P/Churyumov–Gerasimenko.

Sublimation of subsurface supervolatile ices reside at depth much larger than 10 m below the surface. When the solar heat wave reaches this depth it may cause runaway sublimation and subsequent disintegration of the whole nucleus, like in the case of 73P/Schwassmann-Wachmann. In September 1995, this comet began to disintegrate and to release fragments and large amounts of debris and dust along its orbit. Other processes leading to splitting of comets are tidal stresses and spin-up disruption of the nucleus. Cometary splitting is a rather common phenomenon at a rate of ~1 per 100 years per comet. This large rate suggests that splitting may be an important destructive process for cometary nuclei and the generation of cometary debris.

=== Asteroids ===
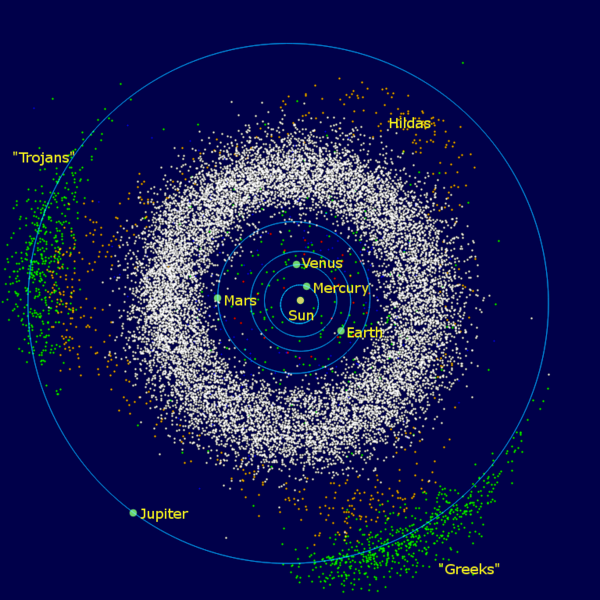
The asteroids of the inner Solar System and Jupiter

Asteroids are remnants of the protoplanetary disc in a region where gravitational perturbations by Jupiter prevented the accretion of planetesimals into planets. The orbit distribution of asteroids is controlled by Jupiter. The greatest concentration of asteroids (main-belt asteroids) have semimajor axes between at 2.06 and 3.27 AU where the strong 4:1 and 2:1 orbital resonances with Jupiter (Kirkwood gaps) lie. Their orbits have eccentricities less than 0.33 and inclinations below 30°. At Jupiter distance are the three specific dynamic groups of asteroids. The Trojans share the orbit of Jupiter. They are divided into the Greeks at L4 (ahead of Jupiter) and the Trojans at L5 (trailing Jupiter). The Hilda asteroids are a dynamical group beyond the asteroid belt but within Jupiter's orbit, in a 3:2 orbital resonance with Jupiter. Inside the asteroid belt are Earth-crossing asteroids, that have orbits that pass close to that of Earth. Sizes of asteroids range from the large dwarf planet Ceres at ~1000 km diameter down to m-sized objects, below which they are called meteoroids or dust. The size distribution of asteroids smaller than ~100 km in size follows the steady state collisional fragmentation distribution of Dohnanyi.

Most asteroids formed inside the snow line from mostly chondritic planetesimals and protoplanets over 4.54 billion years ago. Once these protoplanets reached a size of several 100 km heating by radioactivity, impacts, and gravitational pressure melted parts of protoplanets and planetary differentiation set in. Heavier elements (iron and nickel) sank to the center, whereas lighter elements (stony materials) rose to the surface. Further collisions in the asteroid belt destroyed such parent objects and left fragments of very different composition and spectral types in emission, color, and albedo. C-type asteroids are the most common variety (~75%) of known asteroids. They are volatile-rich and have very low albedo because their composition includes a large amount of carbon. Reddish M-type asteroids are considered to be remnant cores of early protoplanets, while S-type asteroids (17%) of moderate albedo are fragments of the siliceous crust. These asteroid types are the parents of the respective meteorite classes. Recently Active asteroid have been observed that eject dust and produce transient, comet-like comae and tails. Potential causes of activity are sublimation of asteroidal ice, impact ejection, rotational instabilities, electrostatic repulsion, and thermal fracture.

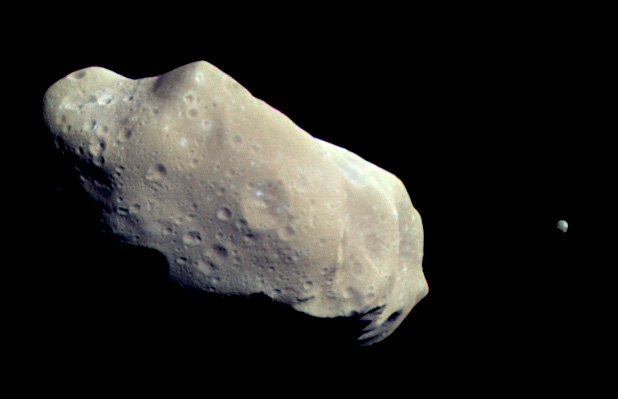
Galileo image of S-type asteroid 243 Ida. The dot to the right is its moon Dactyl.

In the early 1970s the Pioneer 10 and 11 traversed the asteroid belt en route to Jupiter and Saturn. The dust instruments on board, both the penetration detectors and the Zodiacal light instruments did not find an enhanced dust density in the asteroid belt. In 1983 the Infrared Astronomical Satellite (IRAS) mapped the infrared sky brightness and several Solar System dust bands were found in the data. These dust bands were interpreted to be debris produced by recent collisional disruptions of main-belt asteroids. Detailed analysis of candidate asteroids revealed that collisions in the Veritas asteroid family at 3.17 AU, the Koronis family at 2.86 AU about 8 Myr ago, and the Karin Cluster formed about 5.7 Myr ago from a collision of progenitor asteroids. In the early 1990s the Galileo space probe took the first photos of the asteroids 951 Gaspra and 243 Ida. As of 2022 15 asteroids have been visited by spacecraft with three sample-return missions: The S-type asteroid 25143 Itokawa has been visited by Hayabusa in 2005 and returned the sample in 2010, The C-type asteroid 162173 Ryugu has been visited by Hayabusa2 in 2018 and returned the sample in 2020, and C-type asteroid 101955 Bennu has been visited by OSIRIS-REx in 2018 and sample return is planned for 2023. Sample analyses confirmed and refined their meteorite connections. CNSA's Tianwen-2 was launched in May 2025, to explore the co-orbital near-Earth asteroid 469219 Kamoʻoalewa and the active asteroid 311P/PanSTARRS and collecting samples of the regolith of Kamo'oalewa.

=== Small Solar System bodies and dust ===
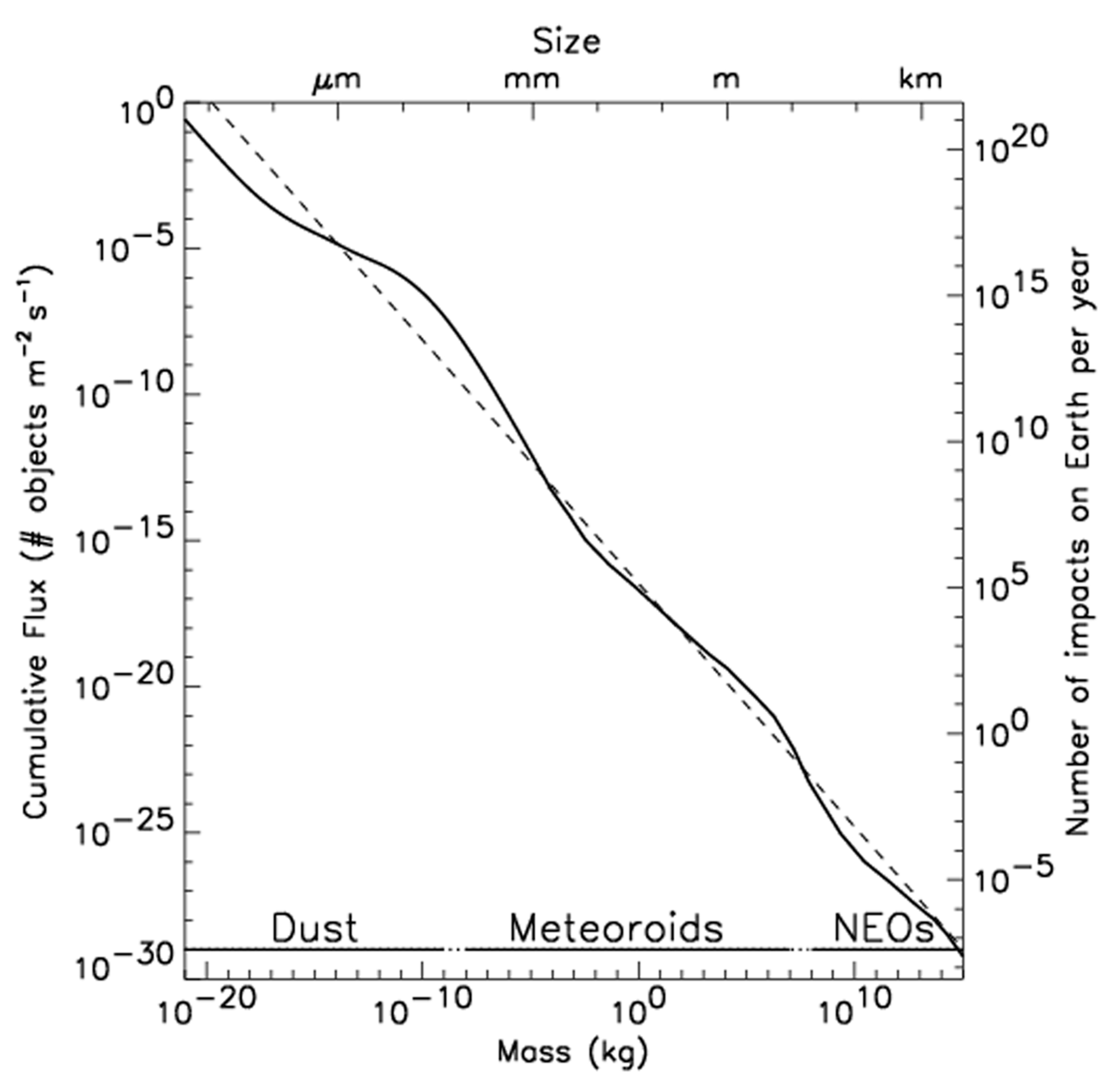
Cumulative flux of interplanetary objects at Earth distance. The solid line is based on lunar microcrater counts, spacecraft measurements, meteor and NEO observations. The dashed line represents a collisional steady-state distribution

Small Solar System objects in interplanetary space range from sub-micrometer-sized dust particles to km-sized comets and asteroids. Fluxes of the smallest interplanetary objects have been determined from lunar microcrater counts and spacecraft measurements and meteor and NEO observations. Currently, small solar system bodies at 1 AU are in a destructive collisional regime. Meteoroids at Earth distance have a mean mutual collision speed of ~20 km/s. At that speed meteoroids can catastrophically disrupt more than 10 times bigger objects and generate numerous smaller fragments.

Dohnanyi demonstrated that asteroids of <100 km diameter reached a collisional steady-state which means that in each mass interval the number of asteroids destroyed by collisions equals the number of same mass fragments generated by collisions from bigger asteroids. This is the case for a cumulative mass distribution F ~ m^{−0.837}. At 1 AU meteoroids bigger than 1 mm in size are in a collisional steady state. The significant excess of smaller meteoroids is due to the input from comets. Models of the interplanetary dust environment of the Earth result in 80-90% of cometary dust vs. only 10-20% of asteroidal dust. The shortage of dust particles <1 micron is due to the rapid dispersion by the Poynting-Robertson effect and by direct radiation pressure.

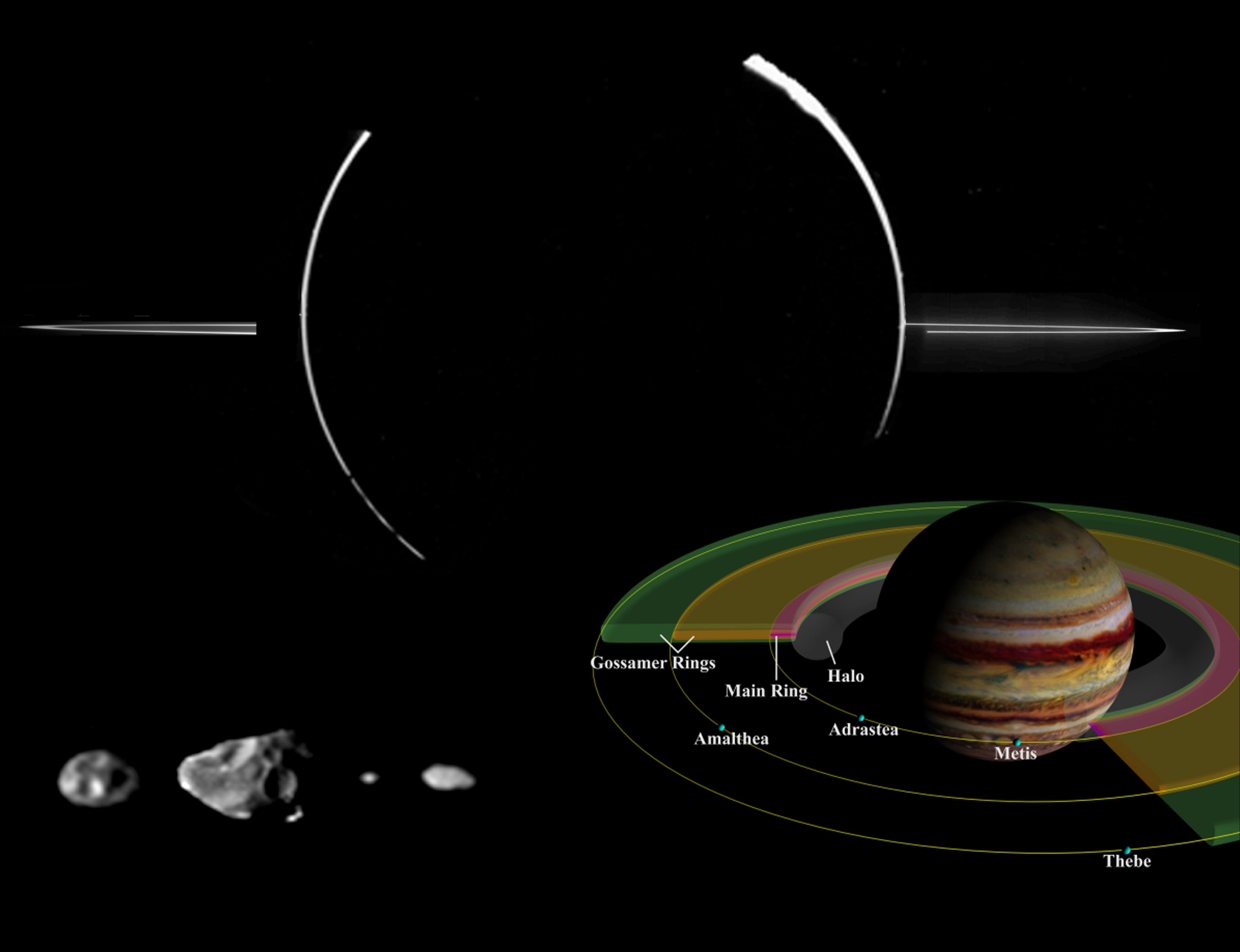
Mosaic of the Jovian ring system and Jupiter's small inner moons. Top, mosaic of images taken by Galileo in forward-scattered light; lower left, Galileo images of (l to r) Thebe (100 km diameter), Amalthea, Adrastea, and Metis; lower right, schema of the Jovian ring system.

In planetary systems collisions play also an important role in generating dust particles. A good example are the Rings of Jupiter. This ring system was discovered by the Voyager 1 space probe and later studied in detail by the Galileo orbiter. It was best seen when the spacecraft was in Jupiter's shadow looking back toward the Sun. Jupiter's ring system is composed of three parts: an outermost gossamer ring, a flat main ring, and an innermost donut-shaped halo which are related to the small inner moons Thebe, Amalthea, Adrastea, and Metis. Bombardment of the moons by interplanetary dust causes the erosion of these satellites and other smaller unseen bodies. The eroded mass is mostly in form of micron-size ejecta particles that escape the gravitation of their source moon and that are seen in the rings. Due to the low escape speeds of 1 to a few 10 m/s most ejecta particles can leave the gravitation of the satellite and feed the Jupiter rings. Measurements by the Galileo dust detector during its passage through the gossamer ring found that the dust particles detected in the ring have sizes of 0.5 − 2.5 microns; with only the biggest particles visible in the camera images. Besides Jovian gravity and the Poynting-Robertson drag micron-sized particles become electrically charged in the energetic Jovian magnetosphere and hence feel the Lorentz force of the powerful magnetic field of Jupiter. All these forces shape the appearance of the rings. Especially, the orbital inclinations of particles in the inner halo are excited by the electromagnetic interaction forcing them to plunge into the Jovian atmosphere. Even the much bigger Galilean moons are surrounded by ejecta dust clouds of a few 1000 km thickness as observed by the Galileo dust detector. Around the Earth Moon the Lunar Dust Experiment (LDEX) on the LADEE mission mapped the dust cloud from 20 to 100 km altitude and found ejecta speeds from 100 m/s to a few km/s; but only a tiny fraction of them escape the gravitation of the Moon.

Also other planets with satellites display a variety of dust ring phenomena. In the massive and dense main rings of Saturn ice particles aggregate to cm-sized and bigger bodies that are continually forming and disintegrating by jostling and tidal force. Just outside Saturn's main rings is the F ring that is shepherded by a pair of moons, Prometheus and Pandora, that interact gravitationally with the ring and act like sinks and donors of dust. Beyond the extended E ring that is fed by cryovolcanism on Enceladus is the Phoebe ring, that is fed meteoroid ejecta from Phoebe that share its retrograde motion. Also Uranus and Neptune have complex ring systems. Besides the narrow main rings of Uranus that are shepherded by satellites there are broad dusty rings. The rings of Neptune consist of narrow and broad dust rings that interact with the inner moons. Even Mars is suspected to have dust rings originating from its moons Phobos and Deimos. Up to now the Mars rings escaped their detection. Even the Earth is developing a human-made space debris belt of defunct artificial satellites and abandoned launch vehicles. Collisions between these objects could cause a collisional cascade, called Kessler syndrome, in which each collision generates more space debris that increases the likelihood of further collisions.

=== Volcanoes and geysers ===
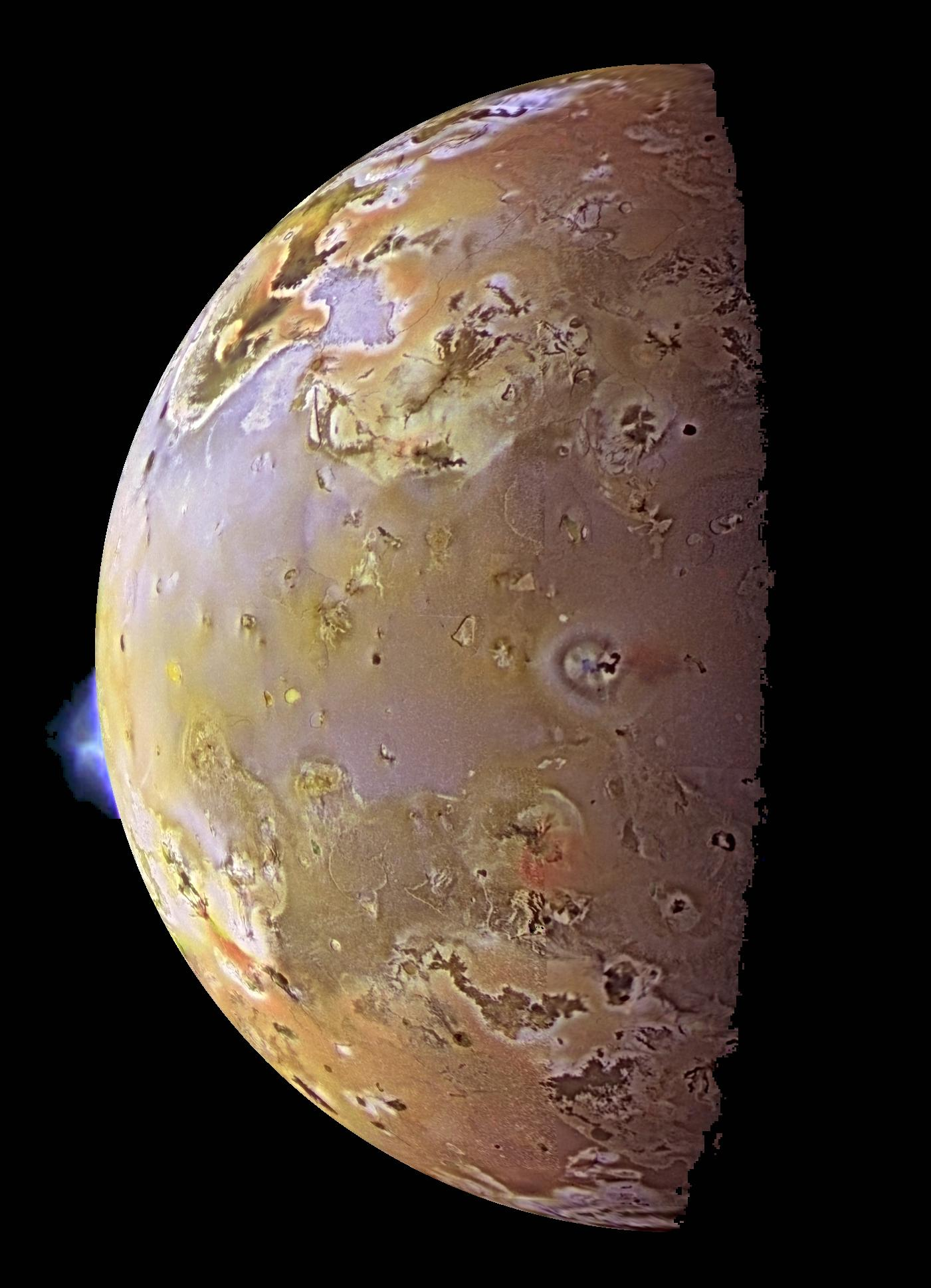
Io with plume erupting from its surface

Venus, Earth, and Mars display signs of ancient or current volcanism. All these planets have a solid crust and a fluid mantle that is heated by internal heat from the planet's formation and the decay of radioactive isotopes. The most explosive volcanic eruptions observed on Earth have plumes of gas and ash up to 40 km height; but no volcanic dust escapes the atmosphere or even the gravitational attraction (Hill sphere) of the Earth. Similar conclusions can be drawn for the suspected active volcanism on Venus.

In smaller planetary bodies heat loss through the surface is larger and hence the internal heat, may not drive active volcanism at the present time. Therefore, it came as a surprise when the twin probes Voyager 1 and Voyager 2 flew through the Jovian system in 1979 and photographed plumes of several volcanoes on Jupiter's moon Io. Only weeks before the flyby Peale, Cassen. and Reynolds (1979) predicted that Io's interior must experience significant tidal heating caused by its orbital resonance with neighbouring moons Europa and Ganymede. Temperature measurements in hotspots by the Galileo spacecraft showed that basaltic magma drives the volcanism on Io. Umbrella-shaped plumes of volatiles like sulfur, sulfur dioxide, and other pyroclasts are ejected skyward from some of Io's volcanoes. E.g. Io's volcano Tvashtar Paterae erupts material more than 300 kilometres above the surface. The ejection speed at the vent is up to 1 km/s which is much below the escape speed from Io of 2.5 km/s, therefore, none of this visible dust escapes Io's gravity. Most of the plume material falls back to the surface as sulphur and sulphur dioxide frost, and pyroclasts. However, in 1992 during its Jupiter flyby the dust detector on the Ulysses mission detected streams of 10 nm-sized dust particles emanating from the Jupiter direction. Subsequent measurements by the Galileo dust detector within the magnetosphere of Jupiter analysed the periodic dust streams and identified Io as source. Nanometer-sized dust particles that are emitted by Io's volcanoes become electrically charged in the Io plasma torus and feel the strong magnetic field of Jupiter. Positively charged dust particles between 10 and 100 nm radius escape Io's and even Jupiter's gravity and enter interplanetary space. During the flyby of the Cassini mission of Jupiter the Cosmic Dust Analyzer (CDA) onboard chemically analysed these stream particles and found sodium chloride as well as sulphur and potassium bearing components, that have also been found by spectroscopic analyses of Io's atmosphere.

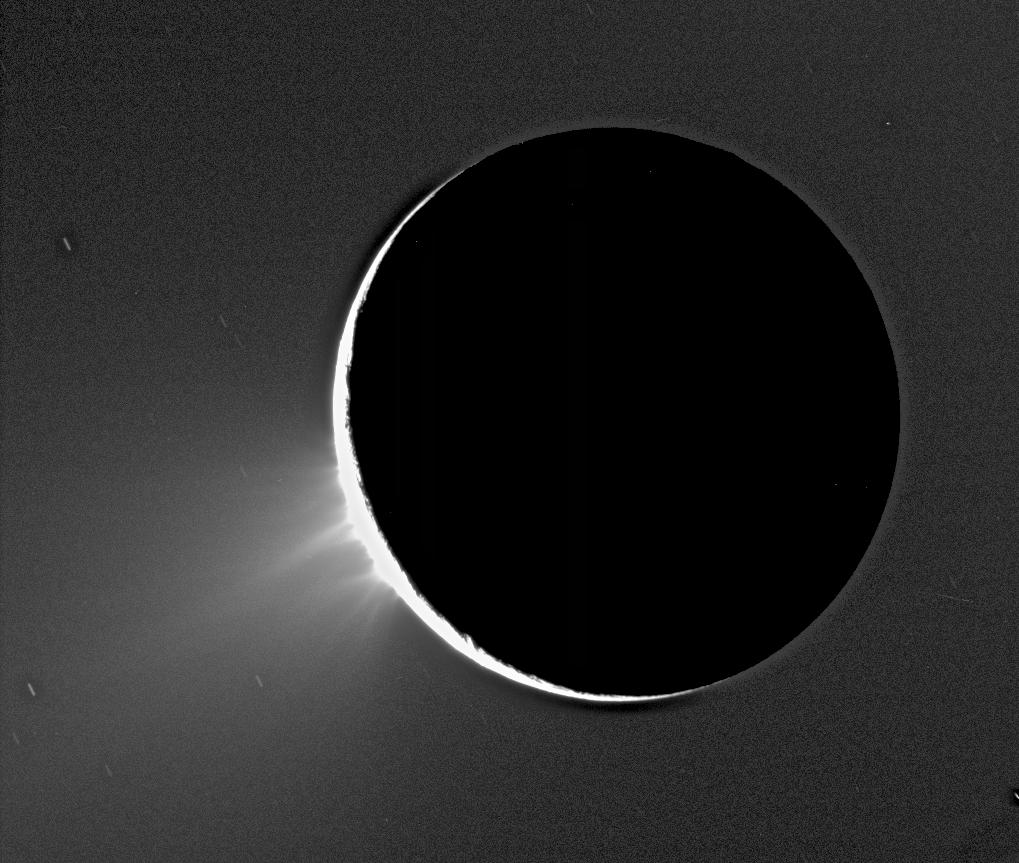
Fountains of Saturn's moon Enceladus

Saturn's tenuous E ring was discovered by observations from Earth distance at times of Saturn's ring plane crossings. It has a maximum density at ~4 Saturn radii, $R_{S}$, which coincides with the orbit of Enceladus. Spacecraft observations by Voyager 1 and 2, and Cassini confirmed these observations. The E ring extends between the orbits of Mimas at 3 $R_{S}$ and Titan at 20 $R_{S}$. The E ring consists of many tiny (micron and sub-micron) particles of water ice with silicates, carbon dioxide, ammonia, and other impurities. Cassini observations demonstrated that Enceladus and the E ring are genetically related. During Cassini's close flyby of Enceladus several instruments including the Cosmic Dust Analyzer observed fountains (geysers) of water vapour and micron-sized ice particles in Enceladus' south polar region. CDA analyses of sodium-salt-rich ice grains in the plumes suggest that the grains formed from a liquid water reservoir that is in contact with rock. The mechanism that drives and sustains the eruptions is thought to be tidal heating caused by the orbital resonance with Dione that excites Enceladus' orbital eccentricity. The ice grains escaping Enceladus' fountains feed and maintain Saturn's E ring.

Similar water vapor plumes were observed by the Hubble Space Telescope above the south polar region of Europa, one of Jupiter's Galilean moons. NASA's future Europa Clipper mission (planned launch date 2024) with its Surface Dust Analyser (SUDA) will analyse small solid particles ejected from Europa by meteoroid impacts and ice particles in potential plumes.

During the Voyager 2 flyby of Neptune in 1989 active dark plumes were observed on the surface of its moon Triton. These plumes are thought to consist of dust and ice particles carried by invisible nitrogen gas jets.

== Cosmic dust dynamics ==
Dynamics of dust particles in space are affected by various forces that determine their trajectories, resp. their orbits. These forces depend on the position of the dust particle with respect to massive bodies and the environmental conditions.

=== Gravity ===
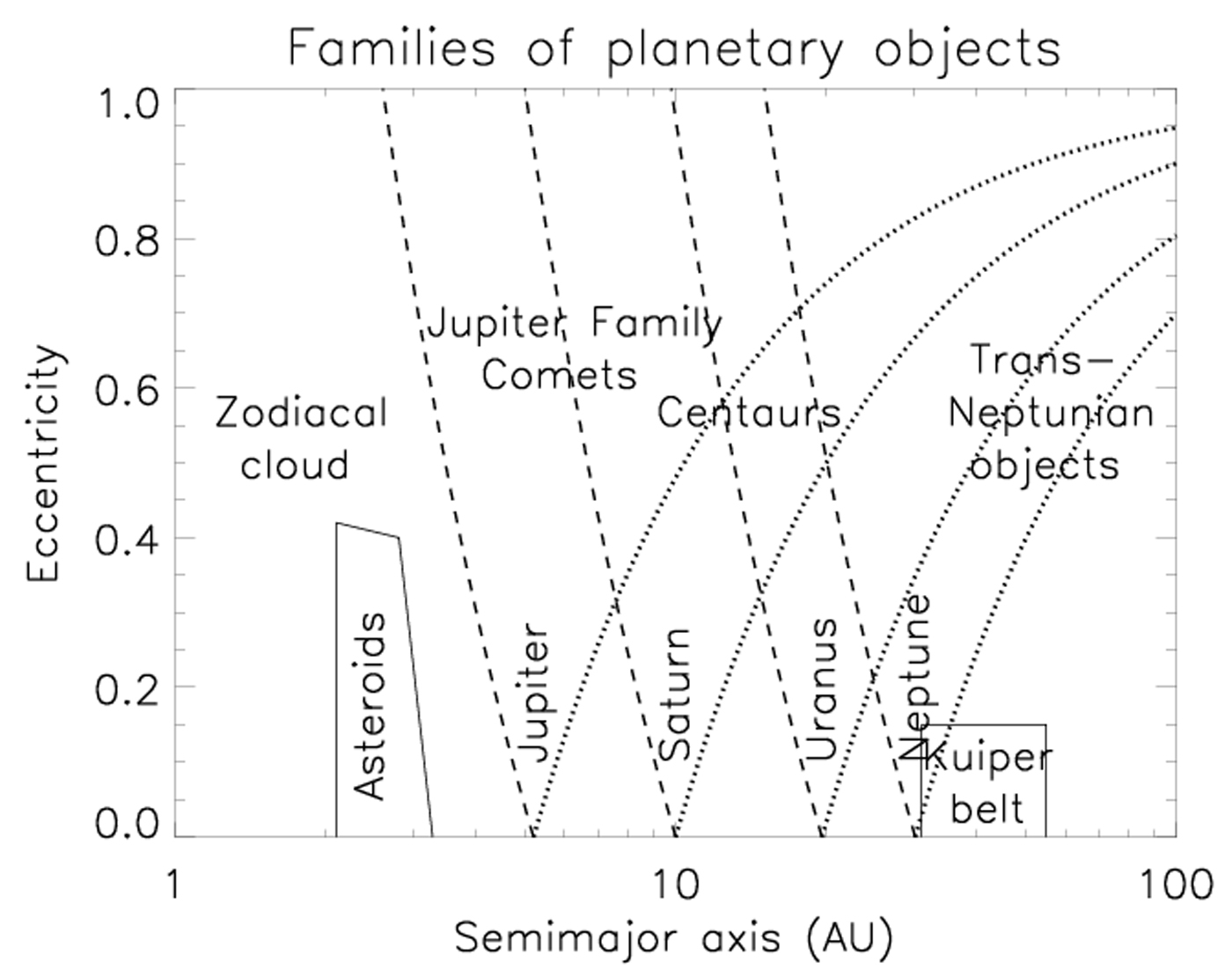
Giant Planets and families of planetary objects and interplanetary dust. Between the dashed and dotted lines connected to a planet is the scattering zone of that planet

In interplanetary space a major force is due to solar gravity that attracts similarly planets and dust particles:
$$F_G = G \frac{M m}{r^2},$$
where F_{G} is the force, M = M_{☉} is the Solar mass, and m is the mass of the object interacting, r is the distance between the centers of the masses and G is the gravitational constant. Planets and small Solar System bodies including interplanetary dust follow Kepler orbits (ellipses, parabolas, or hyperbolas) around the Sun with their barycenter in the foci. The orbits are characterised by the six orbital elements: semimajor axis (a), eccentricity (e), inclination (i), longitude of the ascending node, argument of periapsis, and true anomaly. Although small, planets exert gravitational a force on distant objects. If this force is regular and periodic then such an orbital resonance can stabilize or destabilize orbits of planetary objects. Examples are the Kirkwood gaps in the asteroid belt that are caused by Jupiter resonances and the structure of the Kuiper belt that is caused by Neptune resonances.

Close encounters with a planet can occur when the perihelion $q = (1 - e)a$ of the small body's orbit is closer and the aphelion $Q = (1 + e)a$ is further from the sun than the perturbing planet. This is the necessary condition for orbit scattering to occur; it defines the scattering zone of a planet. In this case a small body or a dust particle can undergo a major orbit perturbation. However, the Tisserand's parameters of the old and the new orbit remains approximately the same. For a small body with semimajor axis a, orbital eccentricity e, and orbital inclination i, and a perturbing planet with semimajor axis $a_P$ the Tisserand's parameter is

$$T_P\ = \frac{a_P}{a} + 2\cos i\sqrt{\frac{a}{a_P} (1-e^2)}$$.

Two families of small Solar System bodies lie outside the scattering zones of the giant planets and are remnants of the primordial protoplanetary disc around the Sun: asteroids and the Kuiper belt objects. The Kuiper belt is approx. 100 times more massive than the asteroid belt and is part of the trans-Neptunian objects (TNOs). The other part of TNOs is the scattered disk with objects having orbits in the scattering zone of Neptune. At high eccentricities (or high inclinations) the scattering zones of neighboring planets overlap. Therefore, scattered disk objects can evolve into Centaurs and, eventually, into Jupiter-family comets. Inside the Jupiter scattering disk is the Zodiacal cloud consisting of interplanetary dust that originates from comets and asteroids. Also dust particles from the Kuiper belt find the scattering passage to the inner planetary system.

Inside the Hill sphere of a planet its gravity dominates the gravity of the sun. All planetary moons and rings are located well inside the Hill sphere and orbit the corresponding planet. Gravitational interactions between such satellites can be seen, e.g., in the stable 1:2:4 orbital resonance of Jupiter's moons Ganymede, Europa and Io. Also subdivisions and structures within the rings of Saturn are caused by resonances with satellites. E.g. the gap between the inner B Ring and the outer A Ring has been cleared by a 2:1 resonance with the moon Mimas. Also some narrow discrete rings of Saturn, Uranus, and Neptune like Saturn's F ring are shaped and held in place by the gravity of one or two shepherd moons.

=== Solar radiation pressure effects ===
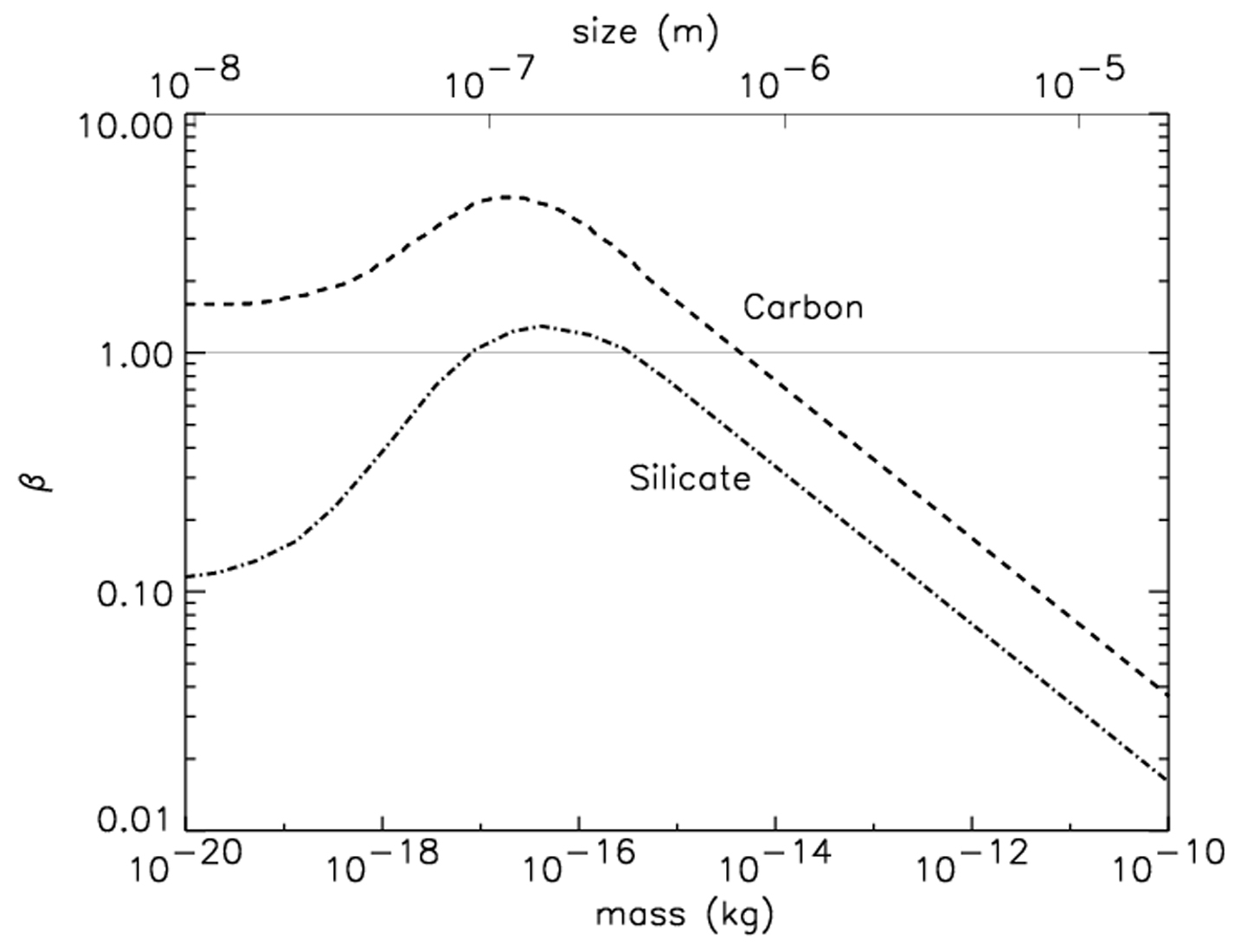
Ratio of solar radiation pressure force to solar gravity, $\beta$, of strongly (Carbon) and moderately (Silicate) light absorbing dust particles

Solar radiation exerts the repulsive radiation pressure force F_{R} on meteoroids and interplanetary dust particles:

$F_R = {{L_\odot Q_{PR} A} \over {4 \pi r^2 c}},$

where ${L_\odot}$ is the solar luminosity or $L_\odot \over {4 \pi r^2}$ is the solar irradiance at heliocentric distance r, $Q_{\rm PR}$ is the radiation pressure coefficient of the particle, $A$ is the cross section (for spherical particles $A =\pi s^2$ with particle radius $s$), $c$ is the speed of light. The radiation pressure coefficient, $Q_{\rm PR}$, depends on optical properties of the particle like absorption, reflection, and light scattering integrated over all wavelengths of the solar spectrum. It can be calculated by using e.g. Mie theorie, discrete dipole approximation, or even microwave analog experiments.

Solar radiation pressure reduces the effective force of gravity on a dust particle and is characterized by the dimensionless parameter $\beta$, the ratio of the radiation pressure force $F_R$ to the force of gravity $F_G$ on the particle:

$$\beta = { F_{\rm r} \over F_{\rm g} }
=  { 3 L_\odot  Q_{\rm PR}  \over { 16 \pi GMc \rho s }  } = 5.7 \times 10^{-4} {Q_{\rm PR} \over { \rho s }}$$

where $\rho$ is the density and $s$ is the size (the radius) of the dust grain. Cometary particles with $\beta$ > 0.1 already have significantly different heliocentric orbits than their parent comet and show up in the dust tail. Dust particles released from a comet (with eccentricity $e_{c}$) near its perihelion will leave the Solar System on hyperbolic orbits if their beta values exceed $\beta = 0.5 (1 - e_c)$. Even particles with $\beta = 0.5$ that are released from an asteroid on a circular orbit around the Sun will leave the Solar System on an unbound parabolic orbit. Small dust particles with $\beta > 1$ are called $\beta$-meteoroids; they feel a net repulsive force from the Sun.

Trajectories of interstellar dust particles with $\beta=0.5$ (top) and $\beta = 1.5$ (bottom). The particles enter the Solar System with a speed of 26 km/s from the left; the axes are scaled in astronomical units.

The trajectories of interstellar dust, which are initially parallel upon entering the Solar System, depend on the particles' $\beta$-ratio. Particles with $\beta<1$ are predominantly attracted by solar gravity; their trajectories are bent towards the Sun. The closer they pass by the Sun, the faster the particles are accelerated, and the stronger they deviate from their initial direction. The trajectories of these particles cross behind the Sun, increasing the dust density there; this is referred to as gravitational focusing. Interstellar dust particles with $\beta>1$ are predominantly repulsed by solar radiation pressure. They cannot approach the Sun below a certain distance that depends on how large their $\beta$ is. This region that is free of interstellar dust is paraboloidal in shape; it is referred to as the $\beta$-cone. At the outer edge of the $\beta$-cone the dust density is enhanced.

The solar radiation pressure force on a particle orbiting the Sun acts not only radially but, because of the finite speed of light there is a small force opposite to the particle's orbit motion. This Poynting–Robertson drag causes the particle to lose angular momentum and, hence, to spiral inward to the Sun. The time, $T_{PR}$ in years, of a particle with a force ratio, $\beta$, to spiral from an initially circular orbit with radius, $a$ in AU, is

$$T_{PR,circ} = 400 \times {a^{2} \over {\beta }}$$

Centimeter-sized particles with $\beta$ ~10^{−4} starting from a circular orbit at Earth distance take about 4 million years to spiral into the sun. This example demonstrates that all dust smaller than ~1 cm in size must have entered recently the inner planetary system in form of cometary, asteroidal, or interstellar dust; no dust is left there from the times of planetary formation.

=== Dust charging and electromagnetic interactions ===
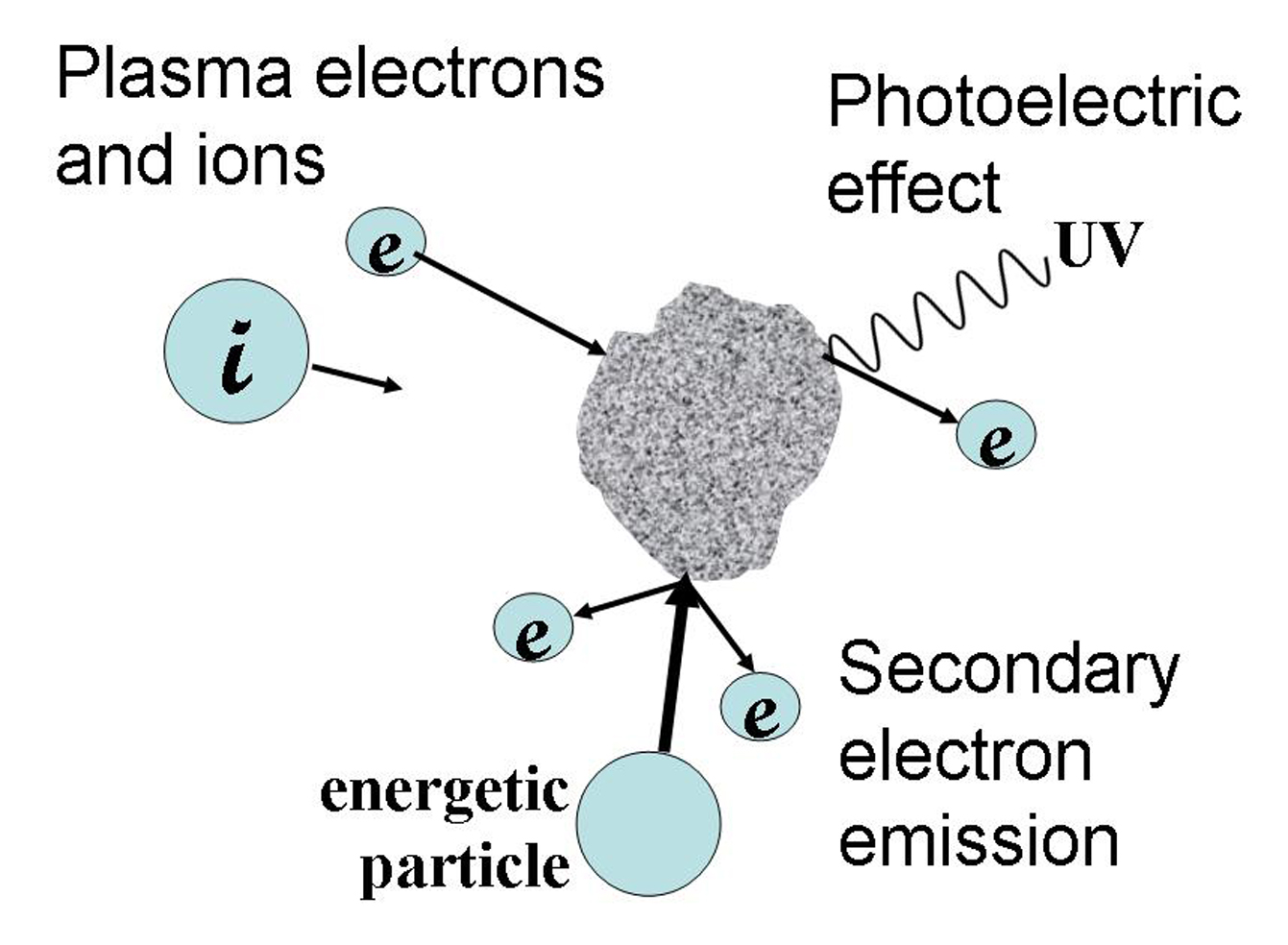
Dust charging processes in space

Dust particles in most space environments are exposed to electric charging currents. Dominant processes are collection of electrons and ions from the ambient plasma, the photoelectric effect from UV radiation, and secondary electron emission from energetic ion or electron radiation. Collection of electrons and ions from the ambient thermal plasma lead to net negative charging because of the much higher thermal electron speed than the ion speed. In contrast to charging in a plasma, photo emission of electrons from the particle by UV radiation leads to positive charging. The impact of energetic ions or electrons with energies >100 eV onto the particle may generate more than one secondary electron and, hence, lead to a positive charging current. The secondary electron yields are dependent on the type and energy of the energetic particle and the particle material. The balance of all charging currents leads to the equilibrium surface potential of the particle. The electric charge, Q, of a dust particle of radius s at a surface potential, U, in space is

$$Q = {4 \pi \varepsilon_0} {U}{s},$$
where ε_{0} is the permittivity of vacuum.

A dust particle of charge Q moving with a velocity v in an electric field E and a magnetic field B experiences the Lorentz force of
$$\mathbf{F_L} = Q\,(\mathbf{E} + \mathbf{v} \times \mathbf{B})$$
In SI units, B is measured in teslas (T).

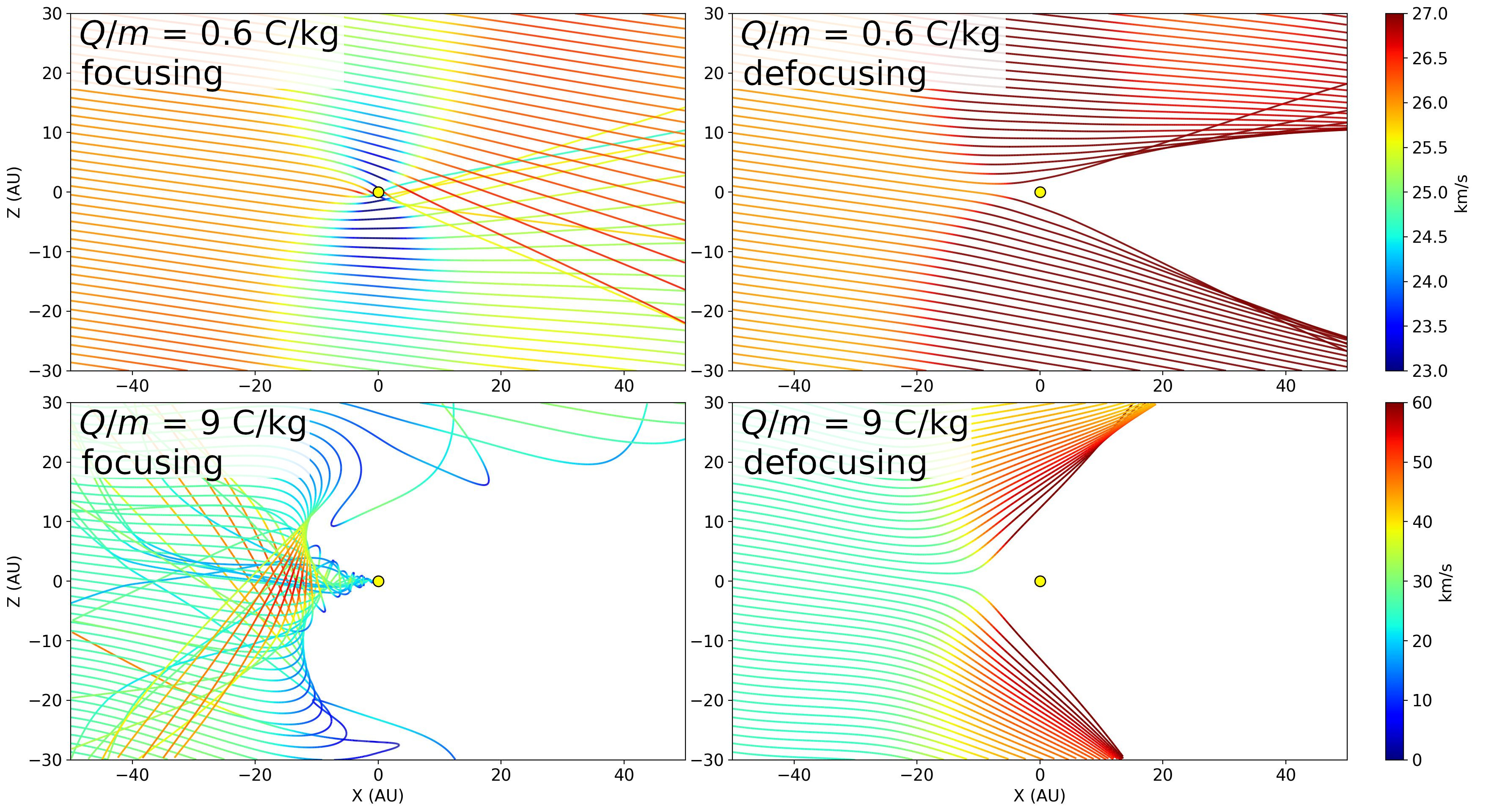
Trajectories of interstellar dust ($\beta=1$) coming from the left are either focused towards (left) or defocused away (right) from the ecliptic plane ($z=0$), depending on the phase of the solar magnetic cycle. This effect is stronger for higher charge-to-mass ratios.

The surface potential of a dust particles and, hence its charge depends on the detailed properties of the ambient environment. For example, an interplanetary dust particle at 1 AU from the Sun is surrounded by solar wind plasma of ~10 eV energy and a density of typically ${5\times 10^6}$ protons and electrons per m^{3}. The photoelectron flux is typically ${3\times 10^{16}}$ electrons per m^{2} and, hence, much larger than the plasma currents. This condition leads to a surface potential of ≈+3 V. Actual measurements of dust charges by Cassini CDA resulted in a surface potential ${U \approx}$ +2 to +7 V. Since both the solar wind plasma density and the solar UV flux scale with heliocentric distance $r^{-2}$ the surface potential of interplanetary dust, ${U \approx}$ +5 V, is also typical for other distances from the Sun. The interplanetary magnetic field is the component of the solar magnetic field that is dragged out from the solar corona by the solar wind. The slow wind (≈ 400 km/s) is confined to the equatorial regions, while fast wind (≈750 km/s) is seen over the poles. The rotation of the Sun twists the dipolar magnetic field and corresponding current sheet into an Archimedean spiral. This heliospheric current sheet has a shape similar to a swirled ballerina skirt, and changes in shape through the solar cycle as the Sun's magnetic field reverses about every 11 years. A charged dust particle feels the Lorentz force of the interplanetary magnetic field that passes by at solar wind speed. At 1 AU from the Sun the average solar wind speed is 450 km/s and the magnetic field strength ${B\approx}$ 5×10^{−9} T = 5 nT. For submicron-sized dust particles this force becomes significant and for particles < 0.1 microns it exceeds solar gravity and the radiation pressure force. For example, interstellar dust particles of ~0.3 microns in size that pass through the heliosphere are either focused or defocused with respect to the solar magnetic equator. A typical measure for how strongly a dust particle is affected by the Lorentz force is its charge-to-mass ratio, $Q/m$. Because the charge of a particle increases linearly with its size, whereas its mass and volume increase with the cube of its size, small particles typically have a much higher charge-to-mass ratio than large particles and are more strongly affected by the Lorentz force. Nevertheless, interstellar dust particles of all sizes are focused or defocused as long as they are charged. This focusing and defocusing is strongest during and close to the respective solar minimum, which for the defocusing occurred in the years surrounding, for example, 1996 and 2019, and for the focusing occurred in the years surrounding, for example, 1986 and 2008. The current phase of the solar magnetic cycle corresponds to the defocusing of interstellar dust away from the ecliptic plane, which is unfavourable for detecting and measuring interstellar dust. The next focusing phase of the solar magnetic cycle, which is best suited for interstellar dust measurements within the solar system, will occur in the 2030s. Because these phases occur every 22 years, the following focusing phase will be in the 2050s.

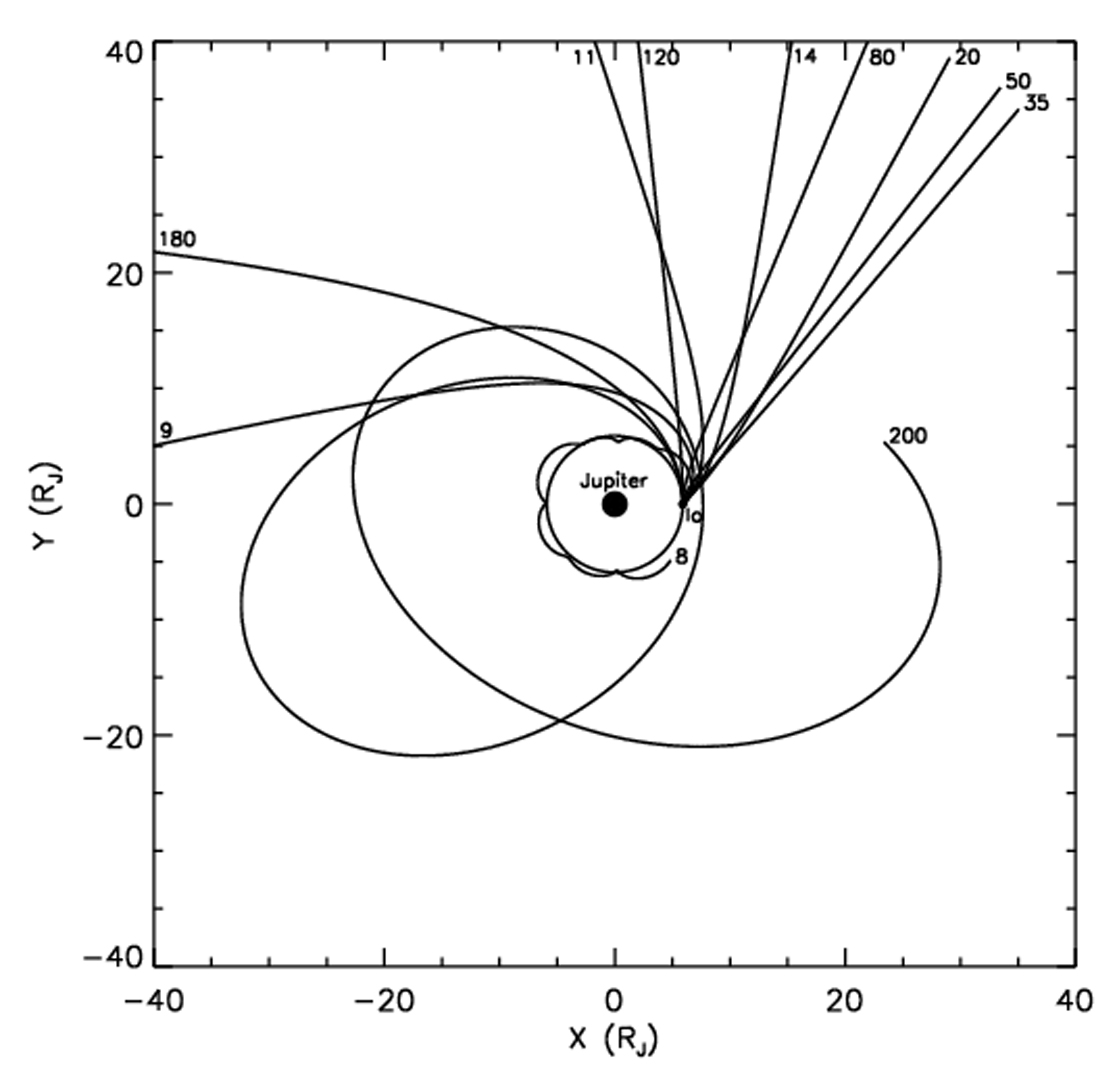
Trajectories of dust particles emitted from Jupiter's moon Io. The dust trajectories are projected onto the equatorial plane of Jupiter. The numbers indicate the size (radius) in nanometers of the emitted dust.

Very different conditions exist in planetary magnetospheres. An extreme case is the magnetosphere of Jupiter where the volcanically active moon Io is a strong source of plasma at 6 $R_J$, where $R_J$ = 7.1×10^{4} km is the radius of Jupiter. At this distance is the peak of the plasma density (3×10^{9} m^{−3}) and the plasma energy has a strong minimum at ~1 eV. Outside this distance the plasma energy rises sharply to 80 eV at 8 $R_J$. The resulting dust surface potentials range from -30 V in the cold plasma between 4 and 6 $R_J$ and +3 V elsewhere. Jupiter's magnetic field is mostly a dipole, with the magnetic axis tilted by ~10° to Jupiter's rotation axis. Out to about 10 $R_J$ from Jupiter the magnetic field and the plasma co-rotates with the planet. At Io's distance the co-rotating magnetic field passes by Io at a speed of 17 km/s and the magnetic field strength ${B\approx}$ 2×10^{−6} T = 2000 nT. Positively charged dust particles from Io in the size (radius) range from 9 to ~120 nanometers are picked up by the strong magnetic field and accelerated out of the Jovian system at speeds up to 350 km/s. For smaller particles the Lorentz force dominates and they gyrate around the magnetic field lines just like ions and electrons do.

In Saturn's magnetosphere the active moon Enceladus at 4 $R_S$ ($R_S$ = 6.0×10^{4} km is Saturn's radius) is a source of oxygen and water ions at a density of 10^{9} m^{−3} and an energy 5 eV. Dust particles are charged to a surface potential of -1 and -2 V. Outside 4 $R_S$ the ion energy increases to 100 eV and the resulting surface potential rises to +5 V. Measurements by Cassini CDA observed this switch of the dust potential directly.

In the partially ionized local interstellar medium the plasma density is about 10^{5} to 10^{6} m^{−3} and the thermal energy 0.6 eV. The photoelectron flux of carbon or silicate particles from the average galactic UV radiation is 1.4×10^{10} electrons per m^{2}. The resultant surface potential of the dust particles is ~+0.5 V. In the hot but tenuous plasma of the Local Bubble (density 10^{5} m^{−3}, energy 100 eV) dust will be charged to +5 to +10 V surface potential. In the local interstellar medium a magnetic field strength of ~0.5 nT has been measured by the Voyager spacecraft. In such a magnetic field a charged micron sized dust particle has a gyroradius < 1 pc.

== Cosmic dust processes ==
Cosmic dust particles in space are affected by various effects that change their physical, and chemical properties.

=== Dust accretion ===
Dust accretion describes the processes of dust agglomeration from nanometer-sized dust, evolving into pebbles several centimeters wide, and eventually coalescing into kilometer-sized planetesimals and full-fledged planets.

Nanometer-sized solid condensates originate within circumstellar envelopes or Supernova ejecta, forming the nuclei of dust particles scattered across the universe. These particles integrate into the ambient interstellar medium (ISM). Despite constituting only ~1% of the gas mass density in the ISM, dust particles become intertwined with surrounding gas clouds through friction. The frictional drag scale, l_{drag} signifies the distance a dust particle of mass m_{d} traverses to accumulate an equivalent mass of interstellar gas (primarily hydrogen):

$$l_{drag} =\cfrac{m_{d}}{A_d n_H m_H}$$
where A_{d} refers to the particle's cross section, n_{H} is the local gas density, and m_{H} = $1.67\times 10^{-27}$ kg is the atomic mass of hydrogen.

In the low-density (${10^{5} - 10^{8}}$ H atoms per $m^{3}$) diffuse interstellar medium, dust particles up to micron size couple with gas clouds within a frictional scale of less than 1 pc. Within the denser, colder interstellar medium found in molecular clouds (n_{H} = ${10^{8} - 10^{12} m^{-3}}$), the growth of grains occurs through the accretion of gas-phase elements, leading to an augmentation in dust mass. Predominant components of icy mantles include H_{2}O, NH_{3}, CO_{2}, CO, CH_{3}OH, OCS, and functional groups of complex organic molecules. These dust formations act as shields for molecular gases within dense clouds, safeguarding them against dissociation caused by ultraviolet radiation. The visible darkness of these ice mantles contributes to the characteristic appearance of dense clouds, often referred to as dark clouds. The most condensed areas within molecular clouds initiate gravitational collapse, carrying dust along and giving rise to star-forming regions. These condensations evolve into rotating gas spheres, eventually forming protostars.

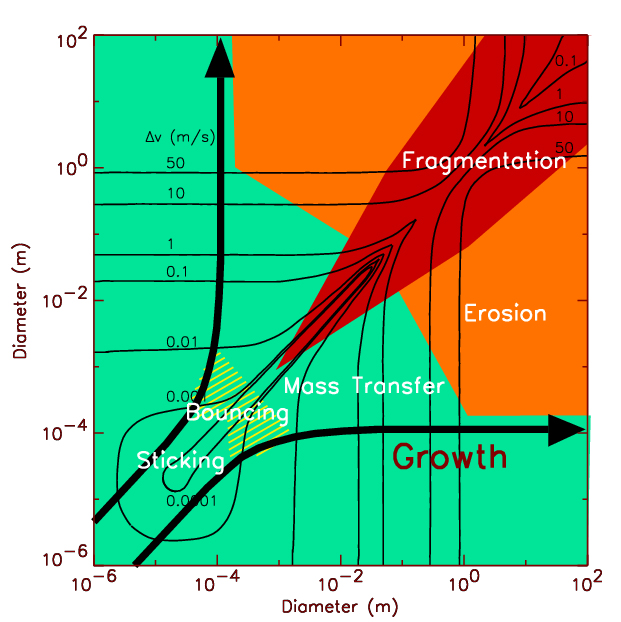
Outcomes of mutual dust collisions within a protoplanetary disk at 1 AU after Testi et al. (2014).

As a result of the conservation of angular momentum, the collapsing nebula spins faster and flattens into a protoplanetary disk spanning tens to hundreds of astronomical units (AU) in diameter. Throughout the collapse, the cloud's density escalates towards the center, leading to increased temperatures due to gravitational contraction. In a protoplanetary disk, both gas and dust densities increase by over a factor of 1000 during collapse according to a model by Hayashi et al., (1985). This model draws parallels to the current Solar System, utilizing the combined planetary mass to estimate the total mass required for their formation. The hot central protostar heats the surrounding dust disk so that, inside the frost line, the condensed ices sublimate, leaving the carbonaceous, silicate, and iron cores of the dust. Outside the frost line icy dust particles form comets and icy planetesimals. Within the disk, the motion of bodies smaller than 1 km is governed more by gas drag than by gravity. Thermal Brownian motion prompts collisions among sub-micron and micron-sized dust particles, while larger particles collide due to radial and transverse velocities induced by non-Keplerian gas rotation. Laboratory experiments spanning the entire parameter spectrum have studied the consequences of mutual dust collisions. These experiments consistently demonstrate that micron-sized dust grains can grow into millimeter-sized aggregates. Outside the frost line icy aggregates can directly grow to comet or icy planetesimal sizes. Inside the frost line siliceous particles encounter a bouncing barrier. This bouncing barrier ensures that a significant portion of the dust population remains small. Bodies measuring centimeters and larger sizes can accumulate these smaller particles, reaching sizes of around 100 meters within a million years.

The velocities and interactions among planetesimals, the building blocks of planets, play a crucial role in their evolution. Runaway growth occurs when larger planetesimals consume smaller ones within their gravitational pull, eventually leading to the formation of protoplanets.

=== Collisions ===
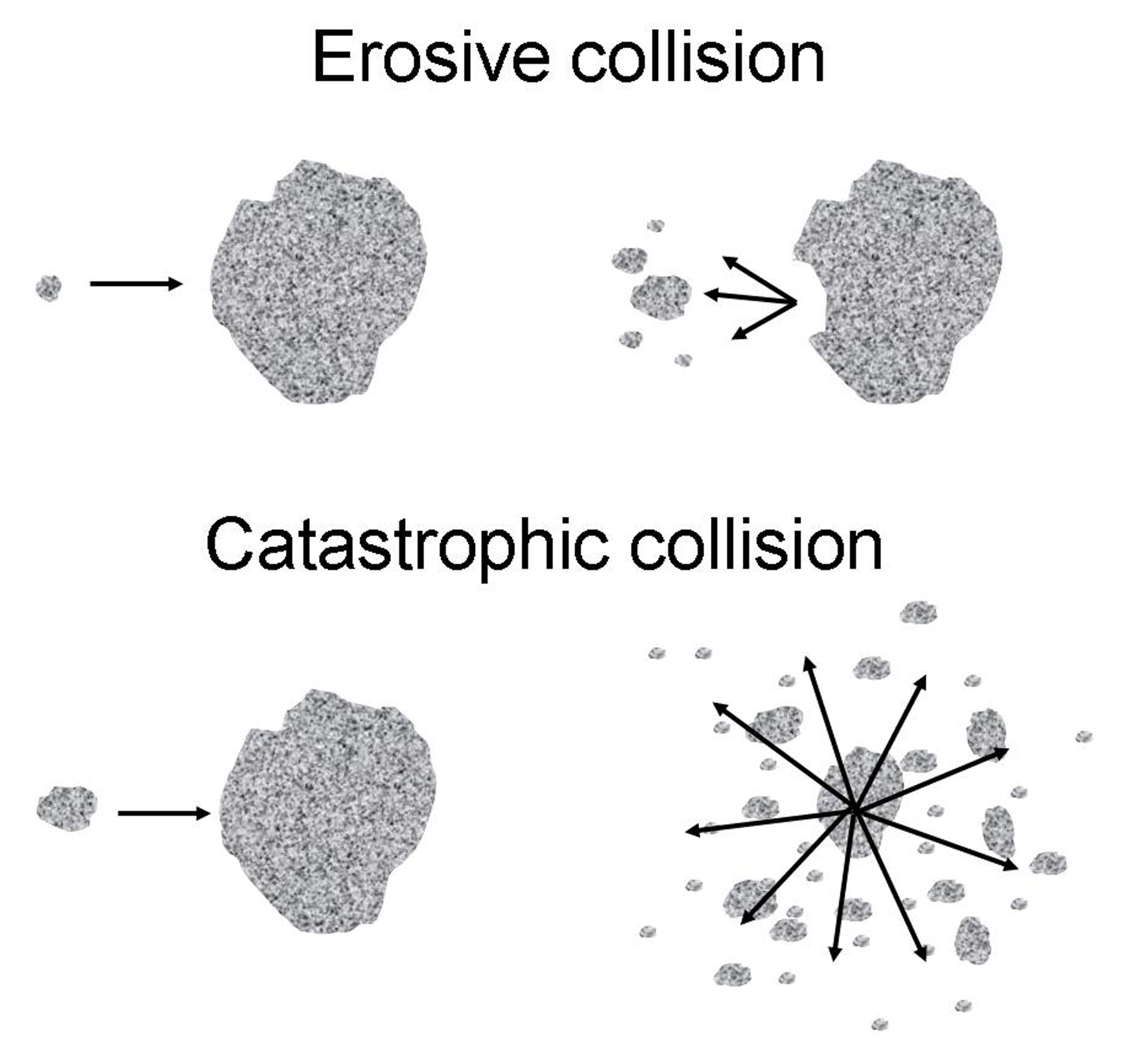
Illustration of types of inelastic collisions among meteoroids

Collisions among dust particles or bigger meteoroids are the dominant process in space that changes the mass of or destroys meteoroids in space and generates new and smaller fragments that contribute to the population of meteoroids and dust. The typical collision speed of meteoroids in interplanetary space at 1 AU from the sun is ~20 km/s. At that speed the kinetic energy of a meteorite is much higher than its heat of vaporization. Therefore, when such a projectile of mass $m_p$ hits a much bigger target object then the projectile and a corresponding part of the target mass vaporize and even get ionized and an impact crater is excavated in the target body by the shock waves released by the impact. The excavated mass $m_e$ is

$$m_e \approx \Gamma_1 m_p$$

where the cratering efficiency factor $\Gamma_1$ scales with the kinetic energy of the projectile. For impact craters on the moon and on asteroids $\Gamma_1 \approx 2000$. Thereby, impact craters erode the target body or meteoroids in space.

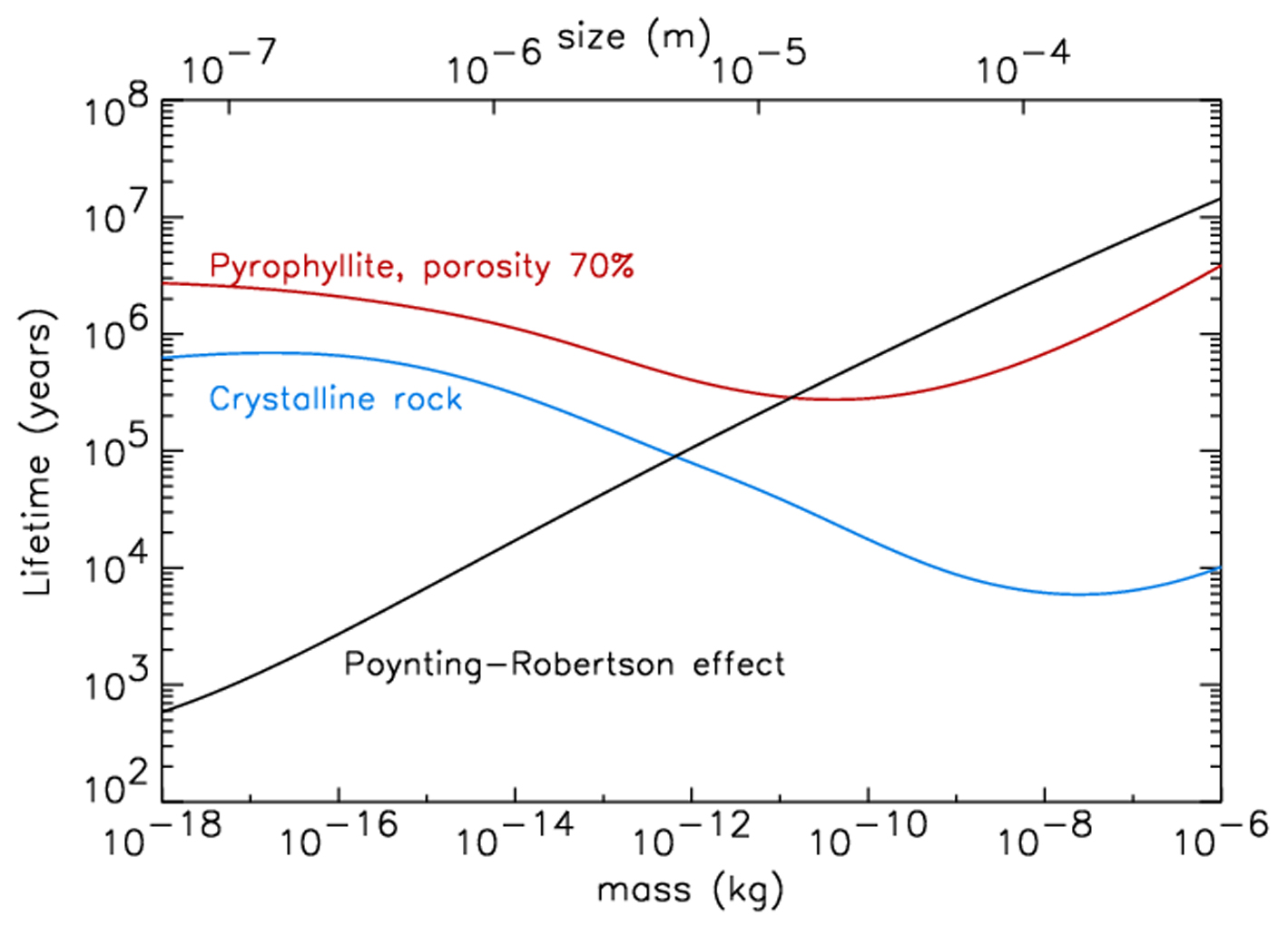
Comparison of collisional lifetimes of interplanetary dust with Pointing-Robertson lifetime at 1 AU.

A target meteoroid of mass $m_T$ is catastrophically disrupted if the mass of the largest fragment remaining is smaller than approx. half of the target mass or

$$m_T \approx \Gamma_2 m_p$$

where $m_p$ is the mass of the projectile and the disruption threshold is $\Gamma_2 \approx 10^6$ for rocky material and $\Gamma_2 \approx 3000$ for porous material. Rocky material represents asteroids and porous material represents comets. Cometary material is porous from nucleus size to micron sized fractal dust it emits.

The collisional lifetime $T_C$ of a dust particle in interplanetary space can be determined where the flux of interplanetary dust is known. This flux $F(m)$ at 1 AU has been derived from lunar microcrater analyses.

$$T_C = {1 \over {F(m/ \Gamma_2) A_p}}$$

where $A_p$ is the scattering cross section ($A_p \approx 4 \pi s^{2}$, with particle radius $s$) in an isotropic flux. Models of the interplanetary dust cloud require that the lifetimes of interplanetary dust particles are longer than those for rock material and, hence, support the result that at 1 AU ~80% of the interplanetary dust is of cometary origin and only ~20% of asteroidal origin. Collisional fragmentation leads to a net loss of interplanetary dust particles more massive than ~2×10^{−9} kg and a net gain of less massive interplanetary dust particles. Comets are believed to replenish the losses of big interplanetary dust.

=== Sublimation ===
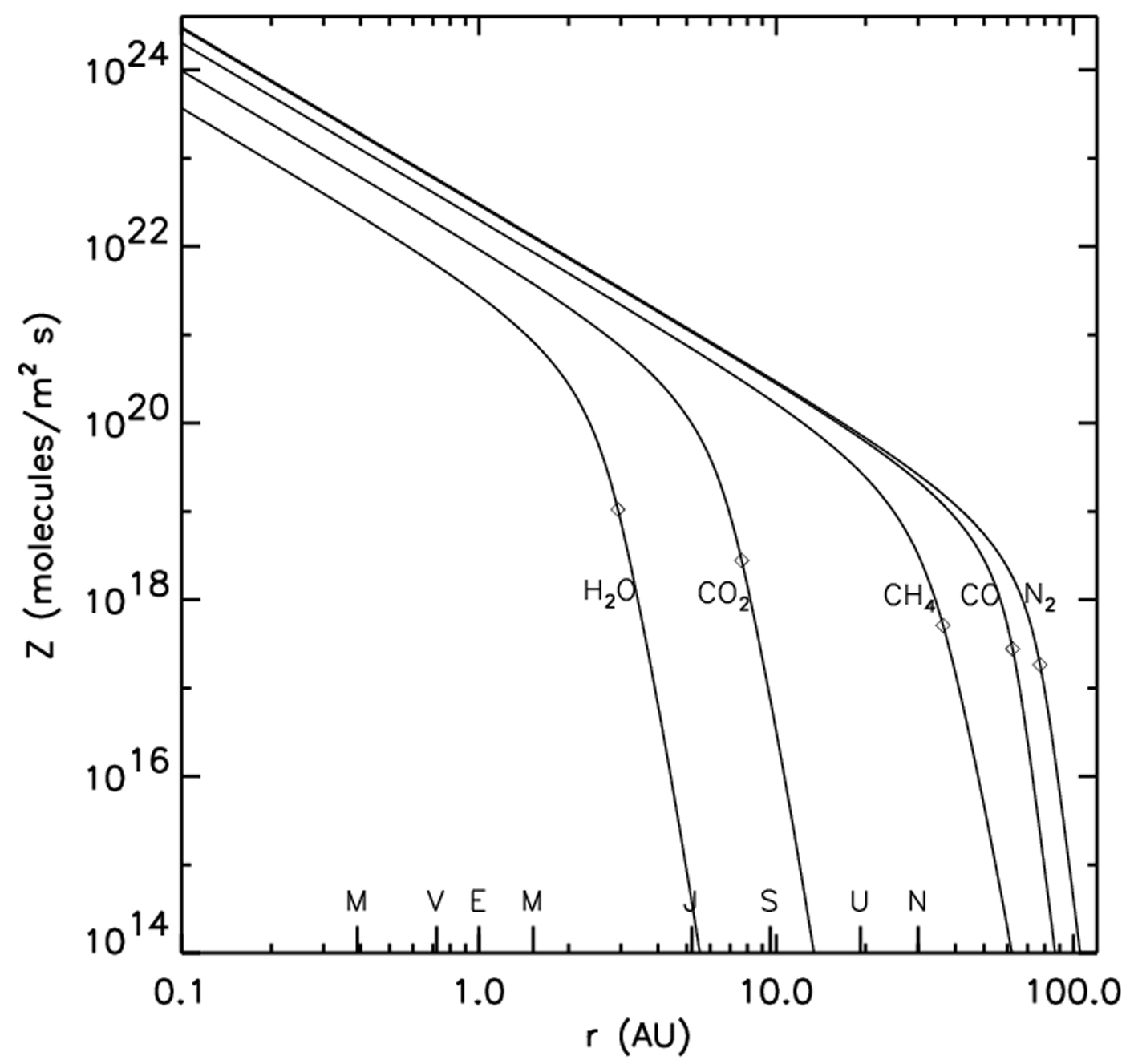
Sublimation rates, Z, of dirty ices by solar radiation. Diamonds indicate the distances at which significant sublimation losses occur. Positions of the planets are shown for reference.

Early infrared observations of the solar corona during an eclipse indicated a dust-free zone inside ~5 solar radii (0.025 AU) from the Sun. Outside of this dust-free zone interplanetary dust consisting of silicates and carbonaceous material will sublimate at temperatures up to 2000 K.

Solar System dust particles are not only small solid particles of meteoritic composition but also particles that contain substances that are liquid or gaseous at terrestrial conditions. Comets carry and release grains containing volatiles in the ice phase into the inner Solar System. Rosetta instruments detected besides the dominant water (H_{2}O) molecules also carbon dioxide (CO_{2}), great variety of CH-, CHN-, CHS-, CHO-, CHO_{2}- and CHNO-bearing saturated and unsaturated species, and the aromatic compound toluene (CH_{3}–C_{6}H_{5}). During Cassini's crossing through Saturn's E ring the Cosmic Dust Analyzer (CDA) found that it consists predominantly of water ice, with minor contributions of silicates, carbon dioxide, ammonia, and hydrocarbons. Analyses of the surface compositions of Pluto and Charon by the New Horizons spacecraft detected a mix of solid nitrogen (N_{2}), methane (CH_{4}), carbon monoxide (CO), ethane (C_{2}H_{6}), and an additional component that imparts color.

Ice particles in the inner planetary system have very short lifetimes. Absorbed solar radiation heats the particle and part of the energy is reradiated back to space and the other part is used to transform the ices into gas that escapes.
$$G_{SC} (1-A_0){r^2} = \sigma (1-A_1) {T^4} +Z(T) L(T)$$

where $G_{SC}$ is the solar irradiance at 1 AU, $A_0$ and $A_1$ are the albedos of the ice in the visible and infrared between 10 and 20 μm wavelength, respectively, $r$ the heliocentric distance, $\sigma$ is the Stefan-Boltzmann constant, $T$ the temperature, $Z(T)$ the production rate of gas, and $L(T)$ the latent heat of vaporization. $Z(T)$ of the ice is deduced from the measured vapour pressure of the subliming ices. At different heliocentric distances interplanetary dust particles have different icy constituents.

=== Sputtering ===
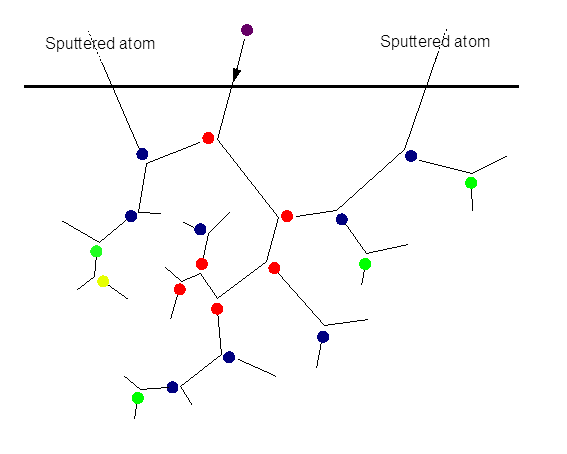
Sputtering cascade. One incoming atom sputters two atoms from the solid sample (below the thick line).

Sputtering, in addition meteoroid bombardment is a significant process involved in space weathering, which alters the physical characteristics of dust particles present in space. When energetic atoms or ions from the surrounding plasma collide with a solid particle in space, atoms or ions are emitted from the particle. The sputter yield denotes the average number of atoms expelled from the target per incident atom or ion. The sputter yield primarily relies on the energy and mass of the incident particles, as well as the mass of the target atoms. Within the interplanetary medium the solar wind plasma primarily consists of electrons, protons and alpha particles, possessing kinetic energies ranging from 0.5 and 10 keV, corresponding to solar wind speeds of 400 to 800 km/s at a distance of 1 AU When compared to impact erosion on the lunar surface, sputtering erosion becomes negligible on scales larger than 1 micron.

In the outer Solar System ices are the dominant surface materials of meteoroids and dust. In addition, the magnetospheres of the giant planets contain heavy ions, like sulphur or oxygen that have a high sputter yield for icy surfaces. E.g. the lifetimes due to sputtering of micron sized dust particles in Saturn's E ring is a few 100 years. During this time the dust particles loose >90% of their mass and spiral from their source at Enceladus (at 4 Saturn radii, $R_S$) to the orbit of Titan at 20 $R_S$.

The sputtering environment within interstellar clouds is relatively harmless. Charged interstellar dust grains interact with the gas through the magnetic field, and the temperatures are moderate, typically below 10,000 K. The primary areas where sputter erosion occurs in the interstellar medium are at the collision interface between randomly moving clouds, reaching speeds of a few hundred kilometers per second, and in supernova shocks. On average, the lifetimes of carbonaceous grains in the interstellar medium have been calculated to be approximately ${4\times 10^{8}}$ years, while silicate grains have a lifespan of approximately ${2\times 10^{8}}$ years.
