= 832 Karin =

Main-belt asteroid

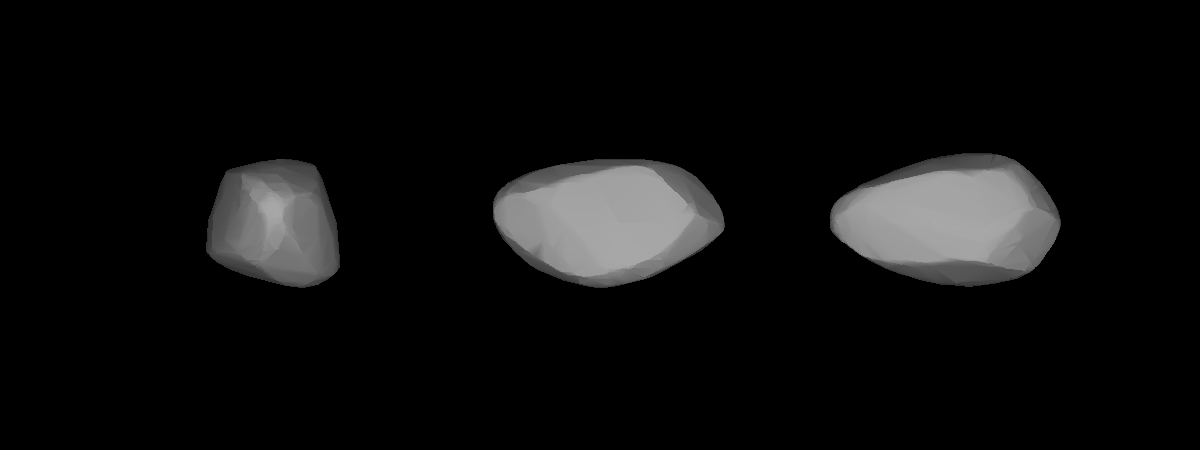
- A three-dimensional model of 832 Karin based on its light curve

Discovery
- Discovered by: Max Wolf
- Discovery site: Heidelberg
- Discovery date: 20 September 1916

Designations
- Alternative designations: 1916 AB
- Minor planet category: Main belt; Karin family

Orbital characteristics
- Epoch 31 July 2016 (JD 2457600.5)
- Uncertainty parameter 0
- Observation arc: 94.56 yr (34538 d)
- Aphelion: 3.0940 AU (462.86 Gm)
- Perihelion: 2.6359 AU (394.33 Gm)
- Semi-major axis: 2.8649 AU (428.58 Gm)
- Eccentricity: 0.079945
- Orbital period (sidereal): 4.85 yr (1771.2 d)
- Mean anomaly: 200.354°
- Mean motion: 0° 12^{m} 11.7^{s} / day
- Inclination: 1.0046°
- Longitude of ascending node: 253.945°
- Argument of perihelion: 122.154°

Physical characteristics
- Mean diameter: 16.6+0.8 −1.5 km (pole solution 1); 17±2 km (pole solution 2)
- Synodic rotation period: 18.3512 h (0.76463 d)
- Pole ecliptic longitude: 242° or 59°
- Pole ecliptic latitude: 46° or 44°
- Geometric albedo: 0.22±0.04 (pole solution 1); 0.23+0.05 −0.06 (pole solution 2)
- Absolute magnitude (H): 11.2; 11.1

832 Karin is a minor planet orbiting the Sun. It is the largest and brightest member of the Karin family, a very young collisional family of smaller asteroids sharing its orbit. The Karin family is thought to have been formed by a collision on Karin 5.8 million years ago.

Karin is an S-type asteroid, approximately 19 km in diameter.

The minor planet is named in honor of Karin Månsdotter, who was the mistress of Erik XIV of Sweden in the 16th century. In 1567, Erik married Karin, but he was pushed from his throne because of this marriage.
