= Karin family =

Sub-group of the Koronis family of asteroids

The Karin family or Karin cluster is an asteroid family and sub-group of the Koronis family. It consists of at least 90 main-belt asteroids. What makes them special is that scientists have used the orbits of 13 members to calculate backwards until they were all found to share the same orbit — that of the parent body from which they all originated.

The family is named for its largest member, 832 Karin, which has a diameter of about 19 km (12 mi). It represents about 15–20% of the mass of the original body which had an estimated diameter of 33 km (21 mi). (832) Karin is an S-type asteroid. (4507) 1990FV was originally thought to be a member of the family but was identified in 2004 as an interloper. The other members have diameters in the 1–7 km range (0.6–4.3 miles).

The family is believed to have been created 5.8 ± 0.2 million years ago, making it the most recent known asteroid collision. Because the surfaces of the family members are relatively pristine, spectroscopic analysis can tell scientists much about their composition and could shed new light on the question of how closely asteroids and meteorites are related. The fact that we know when their surfaces were formed will also be useful in determining the rate of crater formation in asteroids. It is estimated that in about 100 million years the family will have dispersed to a degree where it cannot be separated from the background population of asteroids.

The family may also be the source of one of the interplanetary dust bands discovered by the IRAS satellite and may also have generated meteorites which would have compositions consistent with S-type asteroids and cosmic ray exposure ages of approximately 5.8 million years.

A study of the Karin family has for the first time detected the Yarkovsky effect in main belt asteroids.
