= Helios Dust Instrumentation =

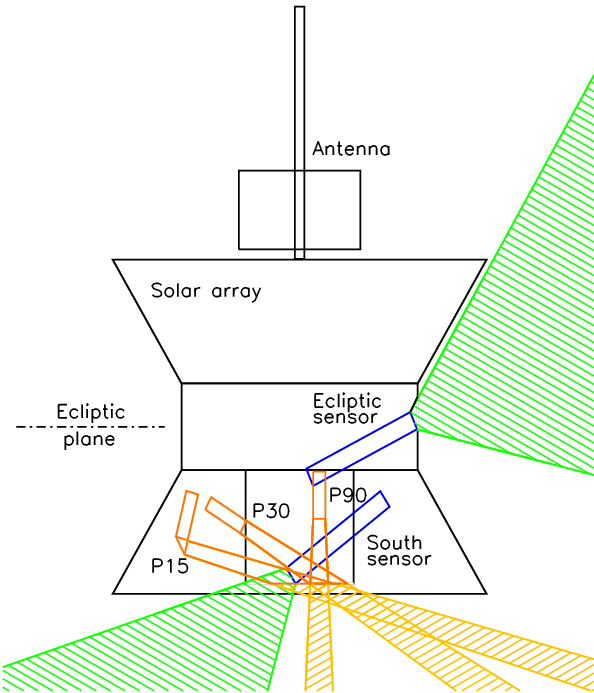
Schematic view of the Helios spacecraft with the three photometers (P15, P30, and P90) of the Zodiacal light instrument and the two sensors of the Micrometeoroid analyzer. The hatched areas indicate the respective field of view.

The Helios 1 and 2 spacecraft each carried two dust instruments to characterize the Zodiacal dust cloud inside the Earth’s orbit down to spacecraft positions 0.3 AU from the sun. The Zodiacal light instrument measured the brightness of light scattered by interplanetary dust along the line of sight. The in situ Micrometeoroid analyzer recorded impacts of meteoroids onto the sensitive detector surface and characterized their composition. The instruments delivered radial profiles of their measured data. Comet or meteoroid streams, and even interstellar dust were identified in the data.

== Overview ==
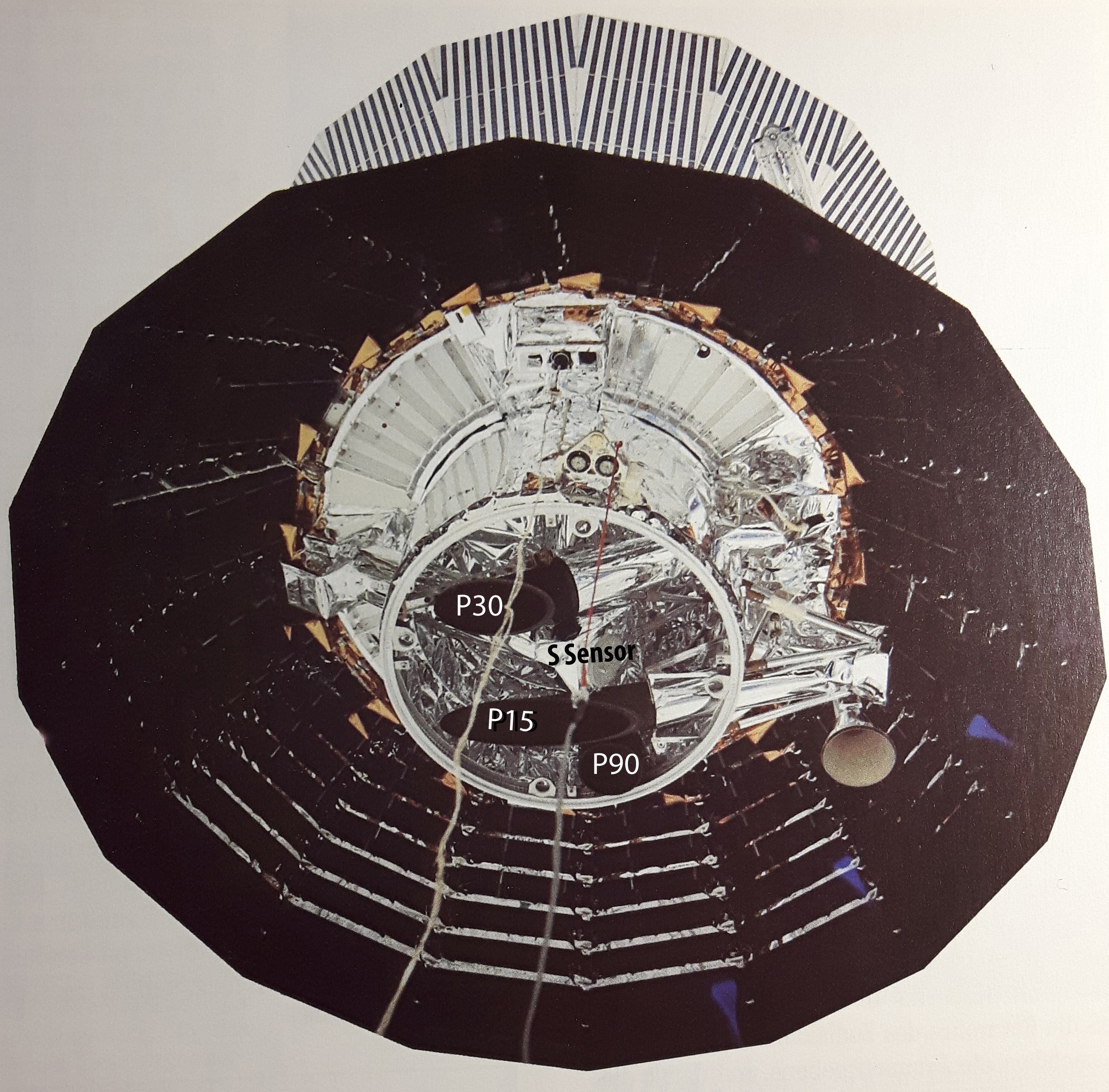
Bottom view of the Helios spacecraft. The three Zodiacal light photometers P15, P30, P90 show the black openings of their stray light baffles. The drift tube of the South (S) micrometeoroid sensor is seen next to the photometers.

The two Helios spacecraft were the result of a joint venture of West Germany's space agency DLR and NASA. The spacecraft were built in Germany and launched from Cape Canaveral Air Force Station, Florida. Helios 1 was launched in December 1974 onto an elliptic orbit between 1 and 0.31 au. Helios 2 followed in January 1976 and reached 0.29 au perihelion distance. The orbital periods were about 6 months. The Helios spacecraft were spinning with the spin axis perpendicular to the ecliptic plane. The Helios 1 spin axis pointed to ecliptic north whereas the Helios 2 orientation was inverted and the spin axis pointed to ecliptic south. The despun high gain antenna beam pointed always to Earth. Because of the orbit the distance between the spacecraft and Earth varied between a few and 300 million km and the data transmission rate varied accordingly. Twice per Helios orbit the spacecraft was in conjunction (in front or behind the Sun) and no data transmission was possible for a few weeks. Helios 1 delivered scientific data for ten years and Helios 2 for five years.

== Zodiacal light instrument ==
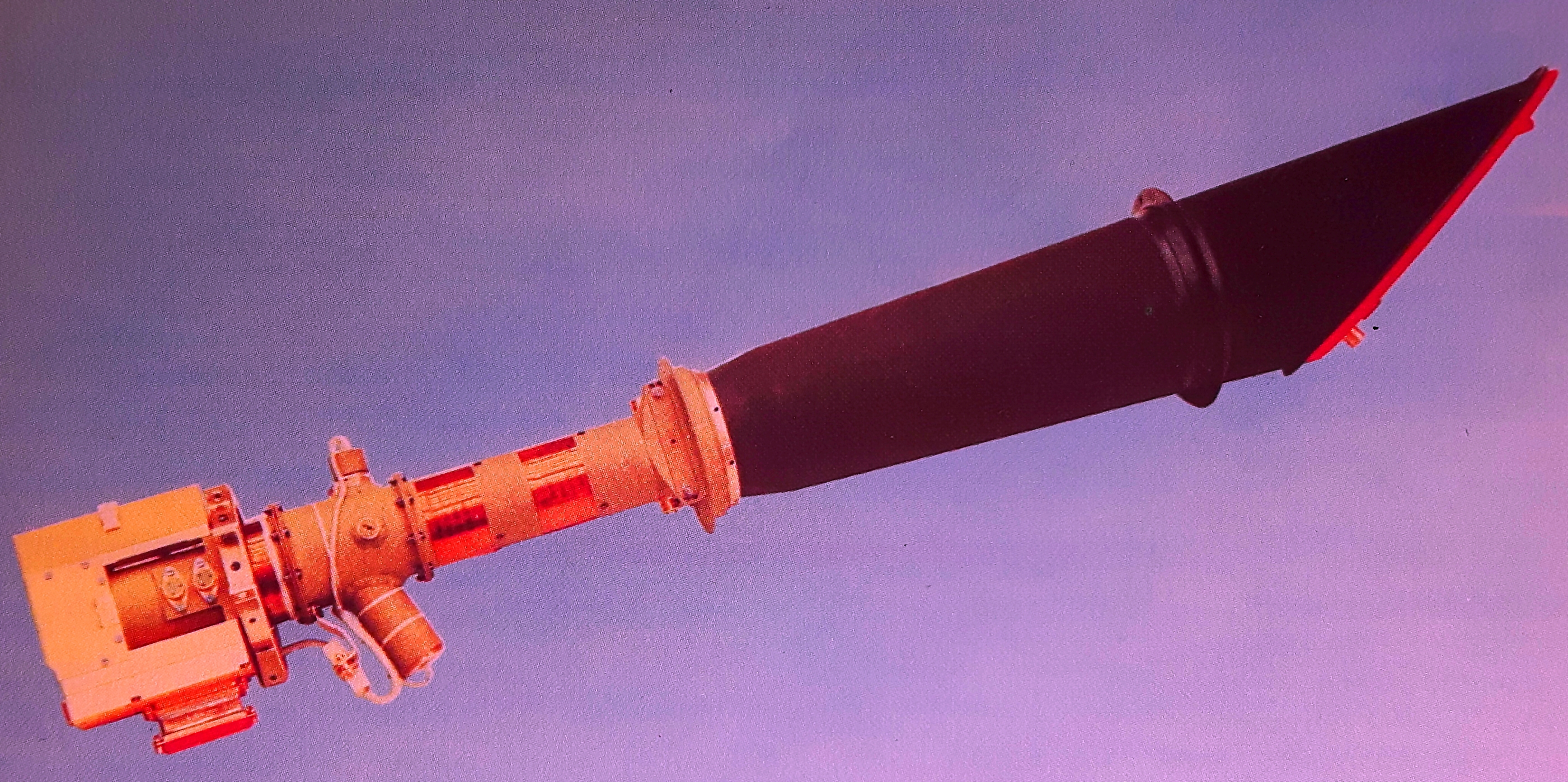
P30, one of the three small photometers making up the zodiacal light instrument. In operation, the light enters from upper right through the black Carbon fibre stray light suppressing baffle.

The primary goal of the Zodiacal light instrument on Helios was to determine the three-dimensional spatial distribution of interplanetary dust. To this end, from all along its orbit, Helios performed precise zodiacal light measurements covering a substantial part of the sky.

These partial sky maps, because of the rotation of Helios, consisted of a band 1° wide at ecliptic latitude ß = 16° with 32 sectors 5.62°, 11.25° and 22.5° long, a similar band 2° wide at ecliptic latitude ß = 31° and a field of 3° diameter at the ecliptic pole. All fields were in the south for Helios 1, in the north for Helios 2. The width of the sectors was chosen to be smallest for the brightest regions of zodiacal light.

This map has been realized by three small (36 mm aperture) photometers, P15, P30, and P90, one for each ecliptic latitude. A stepping motor changed the observing wavelength – with or without polarization – to 360±30 nm, 420±40 nm, 540±70 nm (close to the UBV system) or to dark current and calibration measurements. Each of the 36 resulting different brightness maps represents an average over 512 Helios rotations, leading to a cycle of total length 5.2 hours, which is continually repeated. The sensors were photomultipliers EMR 541 N operating in photon pulse counting mode.

Throughout their mission the Helios space probes were exposed to full sunlight, which exceed the typical zodiacal light intensity by factor of 10^{12} to 10^{13}. For accurate (1%) measurements demanding stray light suppression by a factor of 10^{15} was required, the main design goal to be met. This could be achieved in three steps:

1. The zodiacal light photometers were fully kept in the shadow of the Helios solar cell cone, giving 3×10^{−3} stray light reduction.
2. The multiple reflection in the stray light suppressing baffle added 4×10^{−7}.
3. The coronograph design of the photometers provided the needed additional 3×10^{−6} of stray light reduction.

The Zodiacal light instrument was developed at the Max Planck Institute for Astronomy in Heidelberg by Christoph Leinert and colleagues and built by Dornier systems.

== Micrometeoroid analyzer ==
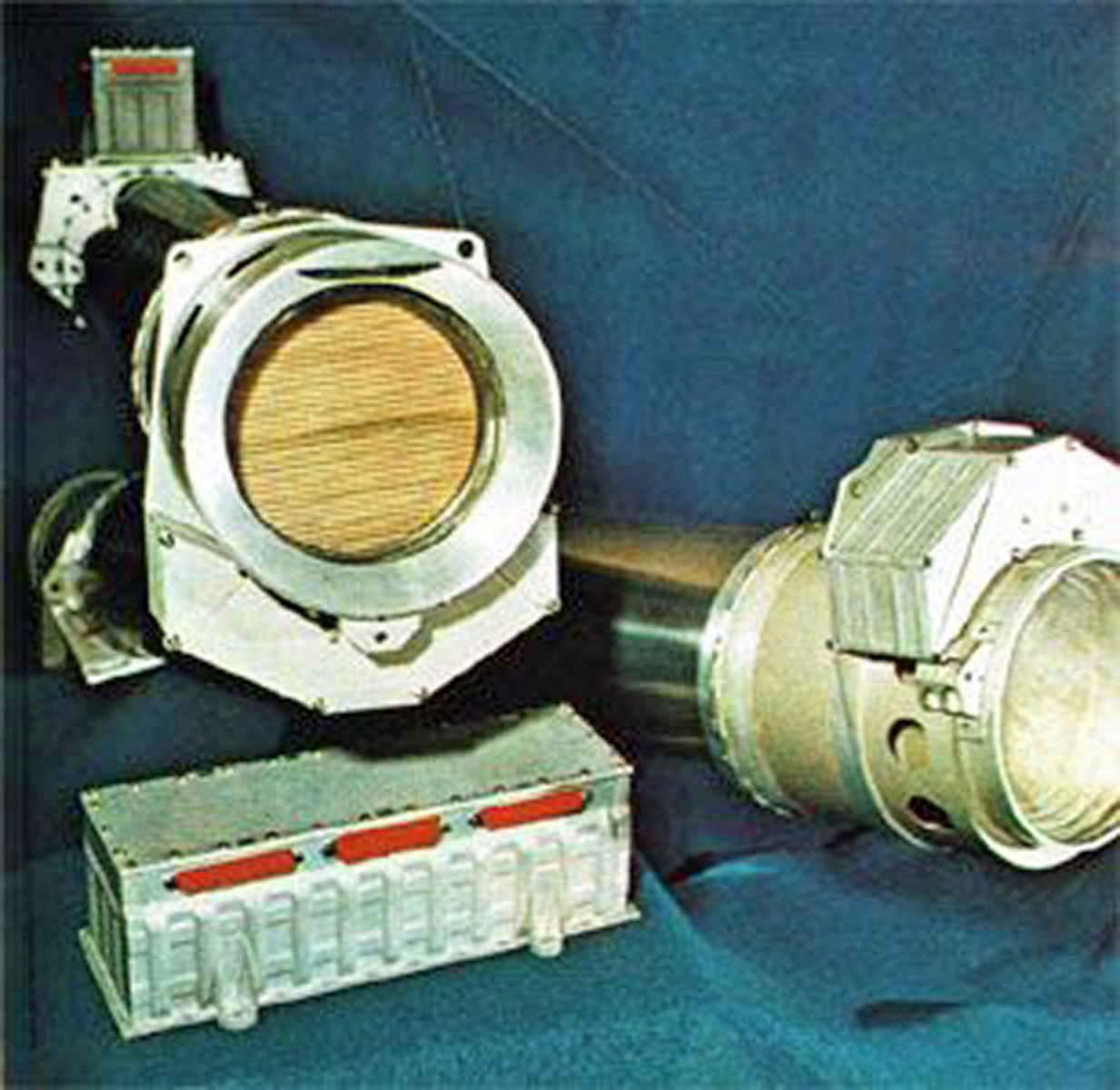
Display of the South and Ecliptic sensors and the common electronics box of the Helios Micrometeoroid Analyzer.

The goal of the Micrometeoroid Analyzer was 1. to determine the spatial distribution of the dust flux in the inner planetary system, and 2. to search for variations of the compositional and physical properties of micrometeoroids.

The instrument consisted of two impact ionization time-of-flight mass spectrometers and was developed by PI Eberhard Grün, Principal Engineer Peter Gammelin, and colleagues at the Max Planck Institute for Nuclear Physics in Heidelberg. Each sensor (Ecliptic sensor and South sensor) was a 1 m long and 0.15 m diameter tube with two grids and a venetian blind type impact target in front, several more grids, a 0.8 m long field-free drift tube and an electron multiplier in the inside. Micrometeoroids hitting the venetian blind type impact target generate an impact plasma. Electrons are collected by the positively biased grid in front of the target while positive ions are drawn inward by a negatively biased grid behind the target. Part of the ions reach the time-lag focusing region from which they fly through the field-free drift tube at −200 V potential. Ions of different masses reach the electron multiplier at different times and generate a mass spectrum at the multiplier output. Impact signals are recorded by charge-sensitive preamplifiers attached to the electron grid in front and the ion grid behind the target. From these signals together with the mass spectrum the mass and energy of the dust particle and the composition of the impact plasma are obtained.

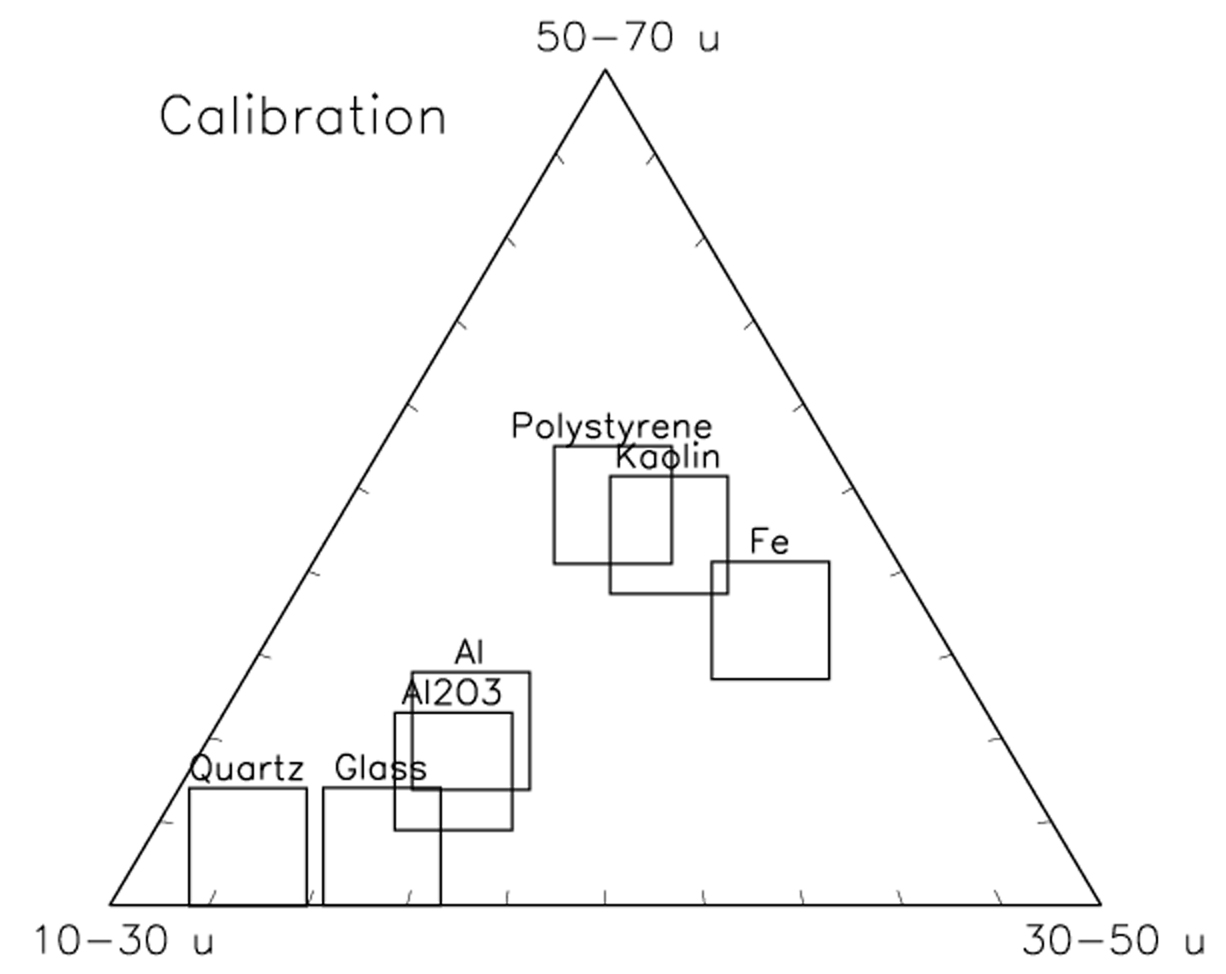
Calibration of the Helios micrometeoroid analyzer with different projectile materials.

The South sensor was shielded by the spacecraft rim from direct sun light, whereas the ecliptic sensor was directly exposed to the intense solar radiation (up to 13 kW/m^{2}). Therefore, the interior of the sensor was protected by a 0.3 μm thick aluminized parylene film which was attached to the first entrance grid. In order to study the effect of micrometeoroids penetrating the film, extensive dust accelerator studies with various materials were performed. It was shown that the penetration limit of the Helios film depends strongly on the density of meteoroids. Impact experiments with a lab version of the Helios micrometeoroid sensor were performed using several materials at the accelerators at the Max Planck Institute for Nuclear Physics in Heidelberg and at the Ames Research Center, ARC, in Moffet Field. The projectile materials included iron (Fe), quartz, glass, aluminium (Al), aluminium oxide (Al_{2}O_{3}), polystyrene, and kaolin. The mass resolution of the mass spectra of the Helios sensors was low $R=\cfrac{M}{\Delta M}\sim 10$, i.e. only ions of atomic mass 10 Da could be separated from ions of mass 11 Da. These mass spectra served as reference for the spectra obtained in space. Spectra were recorded from 10 Da to 70 Da. The mean calibration spectra are presented in a three phase diagram: low masses (10 to 30 Da), medium masses (30 to 50 Da), and high masses (50 to 70 Da).

=== Micrometeoroid data ===
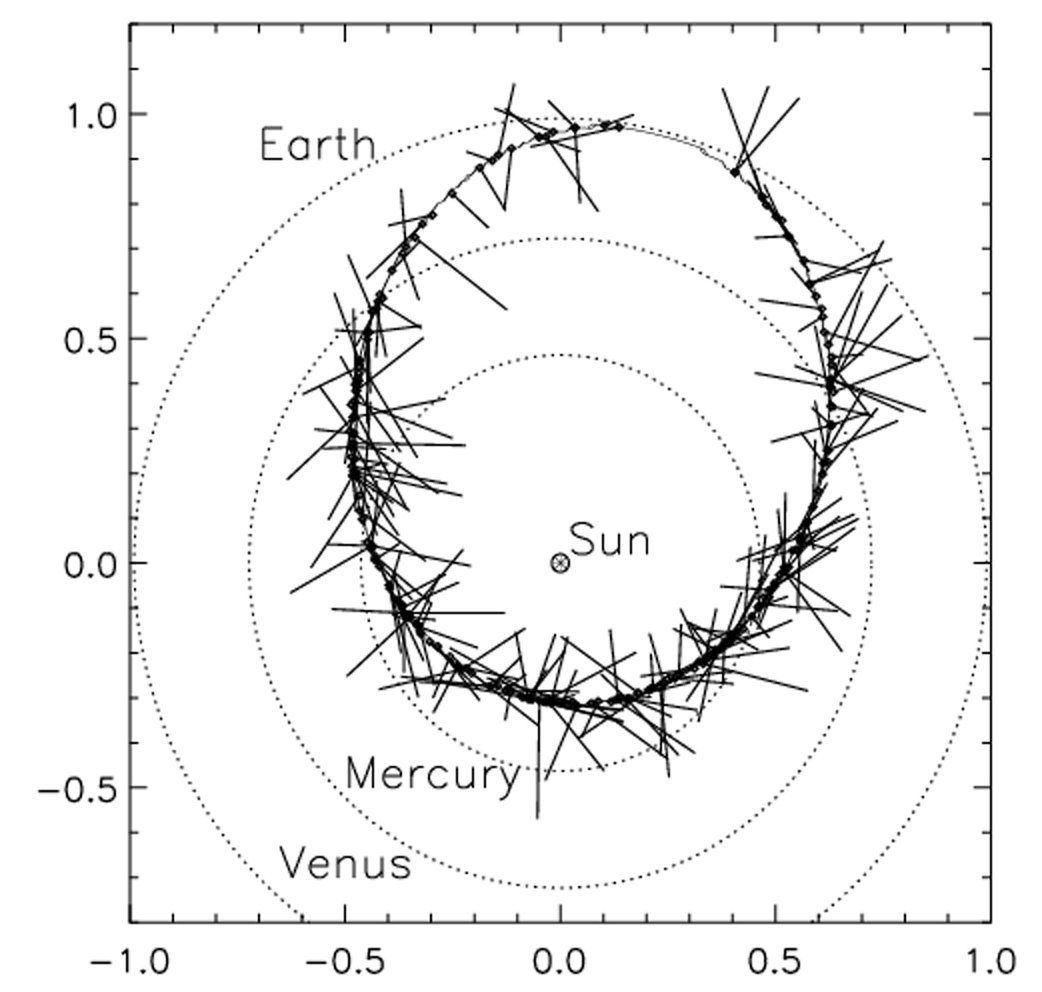
Helios 1 Orbit with meteoroid impacts and sensor viewing direction at time of impact. The length of the bars indicate the magnitude of the impact charge measured.

During ten orbits about the sun from 1974 to 1980 the Helios 1 micrometeoroid analyzer transmitted data of 235 dust impacts to Earth. Since the onboard data storage capability was limited and the data transmission rate varied strongly depending on the distance between spacecraft and Earth not all data recorded by the sensors was received on Earth. The effective measuring time ranged from ~30% at perihel to ~75% at 1 au distance. Many noise events caused by solar wind plasma and photo-electrons were recorded by the sensors as well. Only events within a coincidence time of 12 microseconds between positive and negative signals and, mainly, the measurement of a mass spectrum following the initial trigger were considered dust impacts. Quantities determined for each impact are: the time and position, the azimuth of the sensor viewing at the time of impact, the total positive charge of the impact signal, the rise-time of the charge signal (proxy for the impact speed) and a complete mass spectrum. The micrometeoroid instrument on Helios 2 was much noisier and recorded only a handful of impacts that did not provide additional information.

== Results ==
The Zodiacal light carries information on those regions of interplanetary space along the line of sight, which contribute significantly to its observed brightness. For Helios this covers the range of 0.09 to about 2 astronomical units.

=== Spatial distribution ===
==== Radial dependencies ====
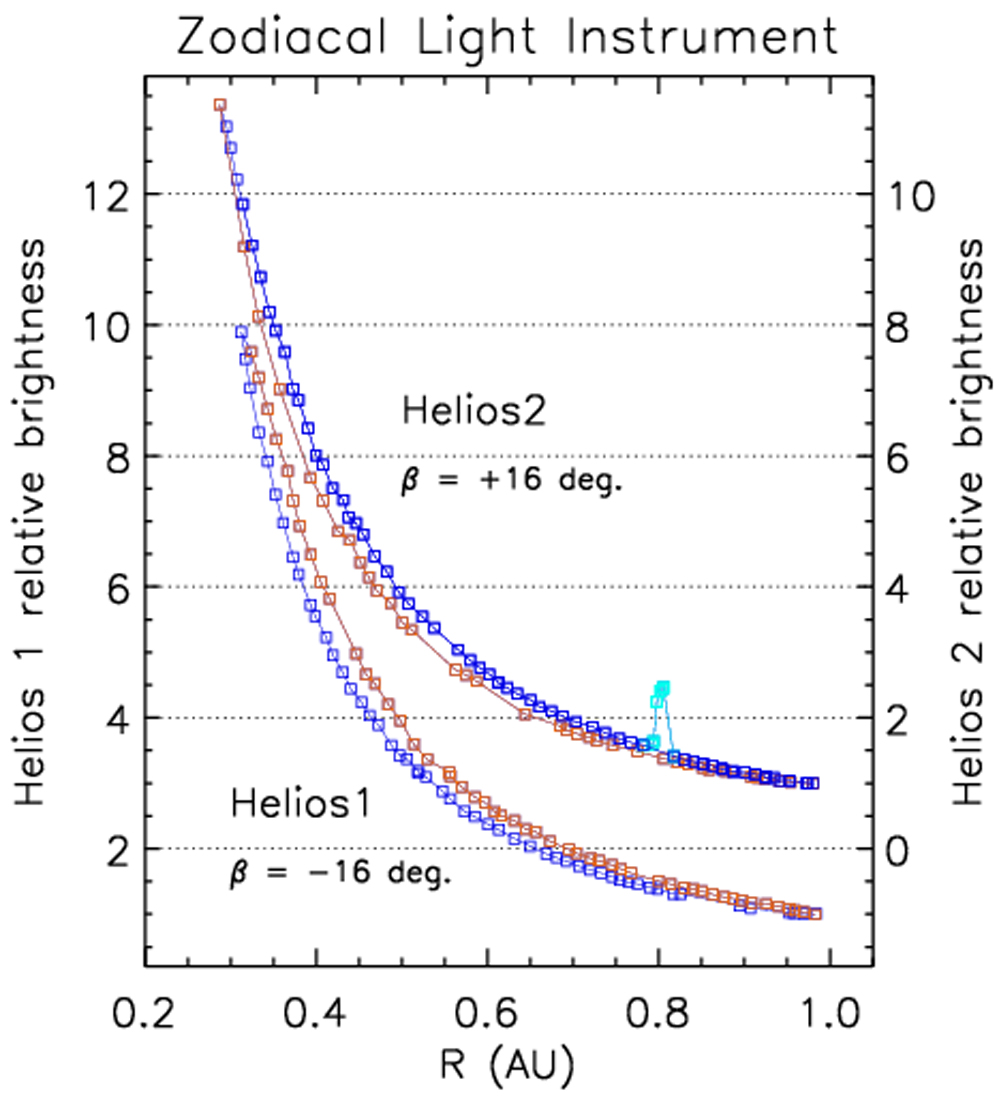
Brightness of the zodiacal light along the orbits of Helios 1 and 2 as observed by the P15 photometers; blue: inward, red: outward motion. The peak at 0.8 au was caused by Comet West passing through the field of view.

The zodiacal light instrument observed a strong increase of the zodiacal light brightness inward the Earth orbit. The brightness was more than a factor 10 higher at spacecraft position 0.3 au than at 1 au. This brightness increase corresponds to interplanetary dust density increase corresponding to $N(r) \sim r^{-1.3}$. This strong increase requires that there is a source of interplanetary dust inside the Earth’s orbit. It was suggested that collisional fragmentation of bigger meteoroids generates the dust observed in the zodiacal light.

The radial flux of micrometeoroids recorded by Helios increased by a factor 5 to 10 depending on the mass from 10^{−17} kg to 10^{−13} kg. This information together with the position and azimuth measurements was used in the first dynamical model of the interplanetary dust cloud; also the zodiacal light intensities observed by the Helios Zodiacal light instrument were included in this model. The Helios data defined the core, the inclined, and the eccentric populations of this model.

==== Plane of symmetry ====
From the difference between the measured zodiacal light brightness during inbound and outbound parts of the orbit and between right and left of the Sun the plane of symmetry of the interplanetary dust cloud was determined. With its ascending node of 87°±5° and inclination of 3.0°±0.3° it lies between the invariable plane of the Solar System and the plane of the solar equator.

=== Orbital distribution ===
Of the 235 impacts total 152 were recorded by the South sensor and 83 by the Ecliptic sensor. This excess of impacts on the South sensor had mostly small impact (charge) signals but there was also some excess of big impacts. From thee azimuth values of Ecliptic sensor impacts it was concluded that the micrometeoroids moved on low eccentric orbits, e < 0.4, whereas South sensor impacts moved mostly on higher eccentric orbits. There was even an excess of outward compared to inward trajectories like the beta-meteoroids that were observed earlier by the Pioneer 8 and 9 dust instruments.

=== Optical, physical, and chemical properties ===
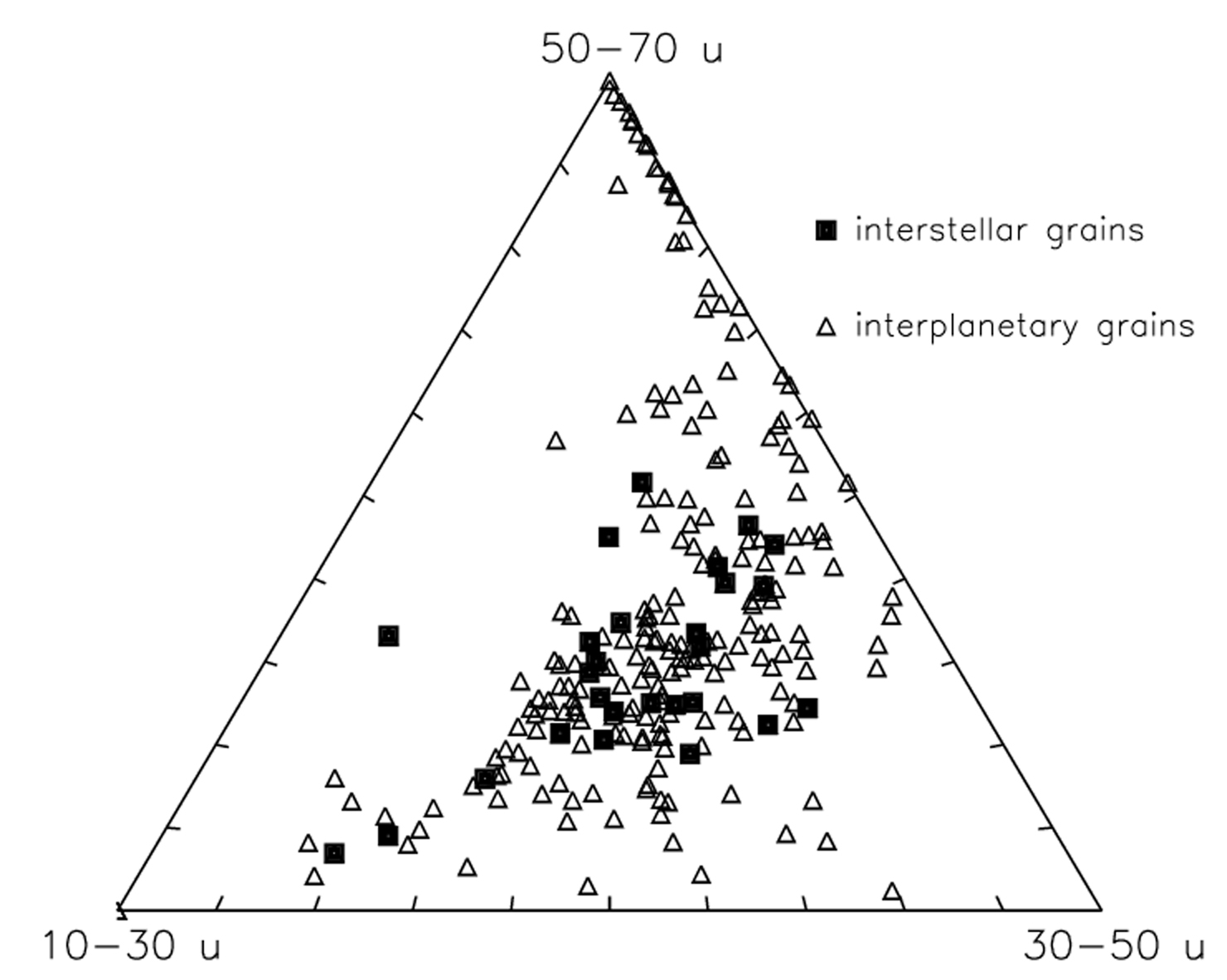
Helios mass spectroscopic analysis of interplanetary and interstellar grains.

The measurements of zodiacal light color – essentially constant along the Helios orbit – and of polarization – showing a decrease closer toward the Sun – also contain information on properties on interplanetary dust particles.

On the basis of the penetration studies with the Helios film the excess of impacts on the South sensor was interpreted to be due to low density, $\rho$ < 1000 kg/m^{3}, meteoroids that were shielded by the entrance film from entering the Ecliptic sensor.

Helios mass spectra range from those with dominant low masses up to 30 Da that are compatible with silicates to those with dominant high masses between 50 and 60 Da of iron and molecular ion types. The spectra display no clustering of single minerals. The continuous transition from low to high ion masses indicates that individual grains are a mixture of various minerals and carbonaceous compounds.

=== Cometary and interstellar dust streams ===
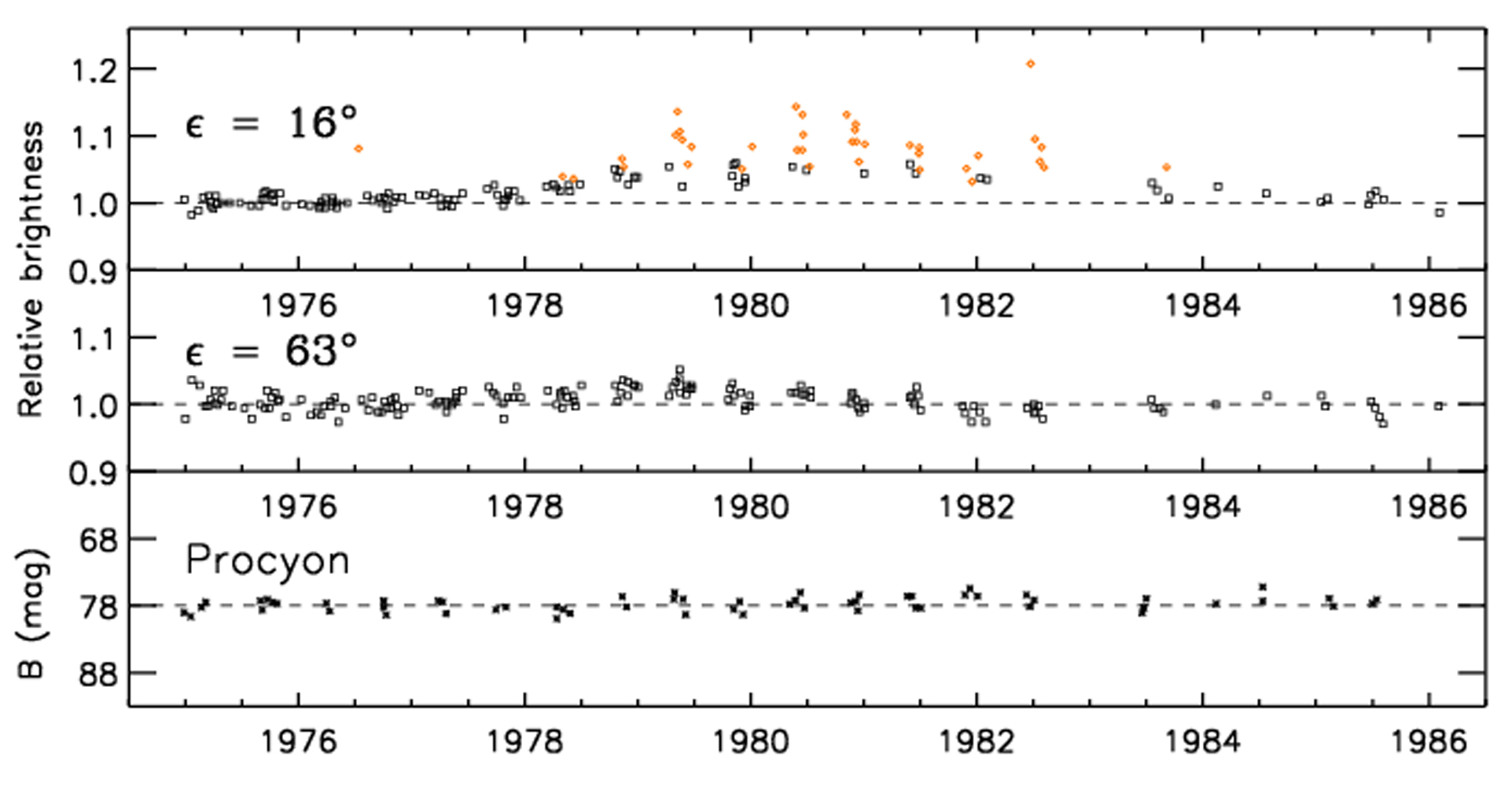
Repeatabiliy of Helios zodiacal light measurements from minimum (1975/1976) through maximum (1979/1980) of solar sunspot cycle 21. Red symbols indicate days with coronal mass ejections and enhanced plasma scattering. For comparison the brightness of Procyon was monitored.

The Helios zodiacal light measurements show excellent stability. This allows detecting local brightness excesses if they are crossed by the Helios field-of-view, like it happened for comet West or for the Quadrantid meteor shower. Repetition by about 0.2% from orbit to orbit sufficed to detect the dust ring along the orbit of Venus.

Inspection of the Helios micrometeoroid data showed a clustering of impacts in the same region of space on different Helios orbits. A search with the Interplanetary Meteoroid Environment for eXploration (IMEX) dust streams in space model identified the trails of comets 45P/Honda–Mrkos–Pajdušáková and 72P/Denning–Fujikawa that Helios traversed multiple times during the first ten orbits around the Sun.

After the discovery of interstellar dust passing through the planetary system by the Ulysses spacecraft interstellar dust particles were also found in the Helios micrometeoroid data. Based on the spacecraft position, the azimuth and impact charge 27 impactors are compatible with an interstellar source. The Helios measurements comprise interstellar dust measurements closest to the Sun.
