= Helios (spacecraft) =

NASA/DLR solar probes launched in 1974–76

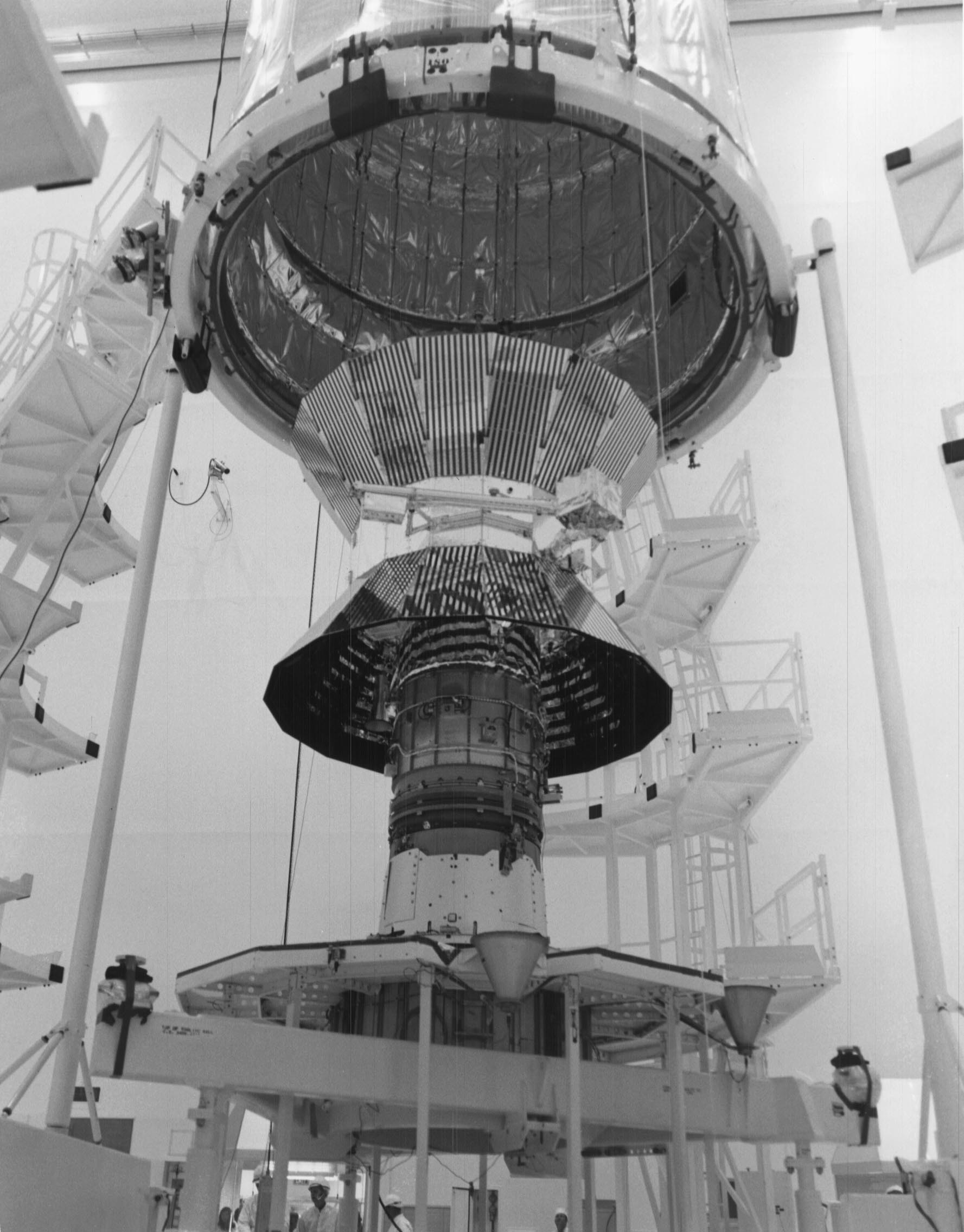
- Prototype of the Helios spacecraft
- Mission type: Solar observation
- Operator: NASA; DFVLR
- COSPAR ID: Helios-A: 1974-097A; Helios-B: 1976-003A
- SATCAT no.: Helios-A: 7567; Helios-B: 8582
- Website: Helios-A: Helios-B:
- Mission duration: Helios-A: 10 years, 1 month, 2 days Helios-B: 3 years, 5 months, 2 days

Spacecraft properties
- Manufacturer: MBB
- Launch mass: Helios-A: 371.2 kg (818 lb); Helios-B: 374 kg (825 lb)
- Power: 270 watts (solar array)

Start of mission
- Launch date: Helios-A: December 10, 1974, 07:11:01 UTC; Helios-B: January 15, 1976, 05:34:00 UTC
- Rocket: Titan IIIE / Centaur
- Launch site: Cape Canaveral SLC-41
- Entered service: Helios-A: January 16, 1975; Helios-B: July 21, 1976

End of mission
- Deactivated: Helios-A: February 18, 1985; Helios-B: December 23, 1979
- Last contact: Helios-A: February 10, 1986; Helios-B: March 3, 1980

Orbital parameters
- Reference system: Heliocentric
- Eccentricity: Helios-A: 0.5218; Helios-B: 0.5456
- Perihelion altitude: Helios-A: 0.31 AU; Helios-B: 0.29 AU
- Aphelion altitude: Helios-A: 0.99 AU; Helios-B: 0.98 AU
- Inclination: Helios-A: 0.02° Helios-B: 0°
- Period: Helios-A: 190.15 days Helios-B: 185.6 days
- Epoch: Helios-A: January 15, 1975, 19:00 UTC; Helios-B: July 20, 1976, 20:00 UTC

Helios-A and Helios-B (after launch renamed Helios 1 and Helios 2) are a pair of probes that were launched into heliocentric orbit to study solar processes. As a joint venture between German Aerospace Center (DLR) and NASA, the probes were launched from Cape Canaveral Air Force Station, Florida, on December 10, 1974, and January 15, 1976, respectively.

The Helios project set a maximum speed record for spacecraft of 252,792 km/h (157,078 mph; 70,220 m/s). Helios-B performed the closest flyby of the Sun so far, a record only broken in October 2018 by the Parker Solar Probe. The probes are no longer functional, but as of 2024 remain in elliptical orbits around the Sun.

== Construction ==
The Helios project was a joint venture of West Germany's space agency DLR (70 percent share) and NASA (30 percent share). The Helios probes, built by the main contractor Messerschmitt-Bölkow-Blohm, were the first space probes built outside the United States and the Soviet Union to leave Earth orbit.

=== Structure ===
The two Helios probes look similar. Helios-A has a mass of 370 kilograms (820 lb), and Helios-B has a mass of 376.5 kilograms (830 lb). Their scientific payloads have a mass of 73.2 kilograms (161 lb) on Helios-A and 76.5 kilograms (169 lb) on Helios-B. The central bodies are sixteen-sided prisms 1.75 metres (5 ft 9 in) in diameter and 0.55 metres (1 ft 10 in) high. Most of the equipment and instrumentation is mounted in this central body. The exceptions are the masts and antennae used during experiments and small telescopes that measure the zodiacal light and emerge from the central body. Two conical solar panels extend above and below the central body, giving the assembly the appearance of a diabolo or spool of thread.

At launch, each probe was 2.12 metres (6 ft 11 in) tall with a maximum diameter of 2.77 metres (9 ft 1 in). Once in orbit, the telecommunications antennae unfolded on top of the probes and increased the heights to 4.2 metres (14 ft). Also deployed were two rigid booms carrying sensors and magnetometers, attached on both sides of the central bodies, and two flexible antennae used for the detection of radio waves, which extended perpendicular to the axes of the spacecraft for a design length of 16 metres (52 ft) each.

The spacecraft spin around their axes, which are perpendicular to the ecliptic, at 60 rpm.

== Systems ==
=== Power ===
Electrical power is provided by solar cells attached to the two truncated cones. To keep the solar panels at a temperature below 165 °C (329 °F) when in proximity to the Sun, the solar cells are interspersed with mirrors, covering 50% of the surface and reflecting part of the incident sunlight while dissipating the excess heat. The power supplied by the solar panels is a minimum of 240 watts when the probe is at aphelion. Its voltage is regulated to 28 volts DC. Silver-zinc batteries were used only during launch.

=== Thermal control ===
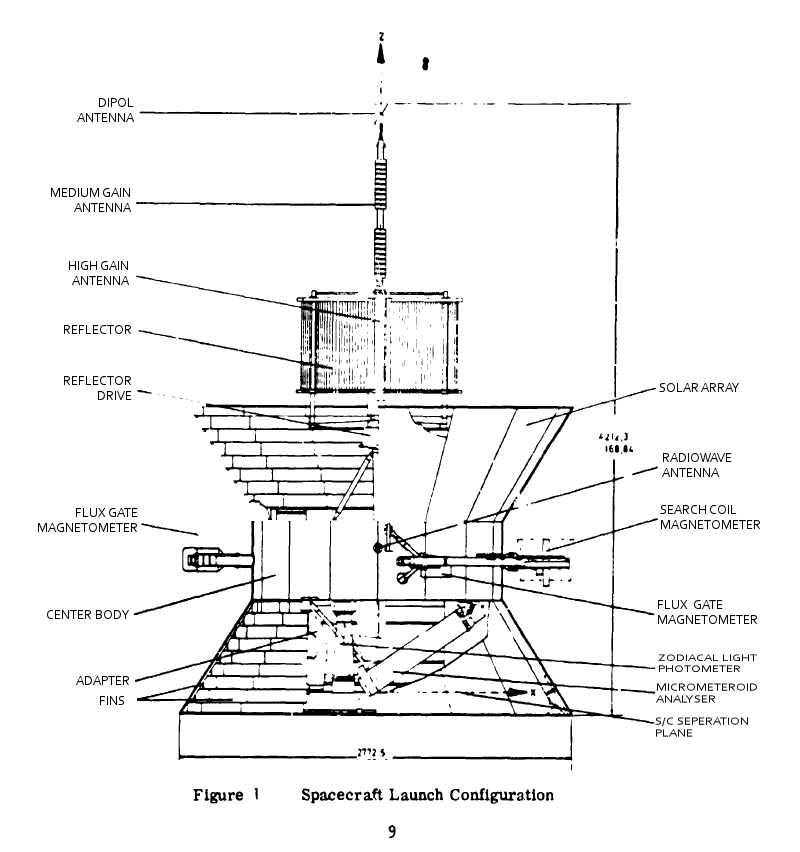
Launch configuration diagram

The biggest technical challenge was to avoid heating during orbit while close to the Sun. At 0.3 astronomical units (45,000,000 km; 28,000,000 mi) from the Sun, approximate heat flow is 11 solar constants, (11 times the amount of solar irradiance received while in Earth orbit), or 15 kW per exposed square meter. At that distance, the probe could reach 370 °C (698 °F).

The solar cells, and the central compartment of instruments had to be maintained at much lower temperatures. The solar cells could not exceed 165 °C (329 °F), while the central compartment had to be maintained between −10 and 20 °C (14 and 68 °F). These restrictions required the rejection of 96 percent of the energy received from the Sun. The conical shape of the solar panels was decided on to reduce heating. Tilting the solar panels with respect to sunlight arriving perpendicularly to the axis of the probe, reflects a greater proportion of the solar radiation. "Second surface mirrors" specially developed by NASA cover the entire central body and 50 percent of the solar generators. These are made of fused quartz, with a silver film on the inner face, which is itself covered with a dielectric material. For additional protection, multi-layer insulation – consisting of 18 layers of 0.25 millimetres (0.0098 in) Mylar or Kapton (depending on location), held apart from each other by small plastic pins intended to prevent the formation of thermal bridges – was used to partially cover the core compartment. In addition to these passive devices, the probes used an active system of movable louvers arranged in a shutter-like pattern along the bottom and top side of the compartment. The opening thereof is controlled separately by a bimetal spring whose length varies with temperature and causes the opening or closing of the shutter. Resistors were also used to help maintain a temperature sufficient for certain equipment.

=== Telecommunications system ===
The telecommunication system uses a radio transceiver, whose power could be adjusted to between 0.5 and 20 watts. Three antennas are mounted on top of each probe. A high-gain antenna (23 dB) of 11° beam width, a medium-gain antenna (3 dB for transmission and 6.3 dB for reception) emits a signal in all directions of the ecliptic plane at the height of 15°, and a low-gain dipole antenna (0.3 dB transmission and 0.8 dB for reception). To be directed continuously toward Earth, the high-gain antenna is rotated by a motor at a speed that counterbalances the spin of the probe. Synchronizing the rotation speed is performed using data supplied by a Sun sensor. The maximum data rate obtained with the large antenna gain was 4096 bits per second upstream. The reception and transmission of signals were supported by the Deep Space Network antennas on Earth.

=== Altitude control ===
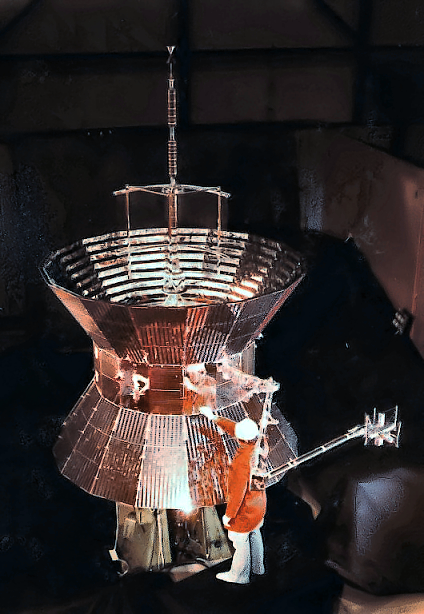
A technician stands next to one of the twin Helios spacecraft

To maintain orientation during the mission, the spacecraft rotated continuously at 60 RPM around its main axis. The orientation control system manages the speed and orientation of the probe's shafts. To determine its orientation, Helios used a crude Sun sensor. Guidance corrections were performed using cold gas thrusters (7.7 kilograms [17 lb] nitrogen) with a boost of 1 Newton. The axis of the probe was permanently maintained keeping it both perpendicular to the direction of the Sun and to the ecliptic plane.

=== On-board computer and data storage ===
The onboard controllers were capable of handling 256 commands. The mass memory could store 500 kb, (this was a very large memory for space probes of the time), and was mainly used when the probes were in superior conjunction relative to the Earth (i.e. the Sun comes between the Earth and the spacecraft). A conjunction could last up to 65 days.

== Mission profile ==
Helios-A and Helios-B were launched on December 10, 1974, and January 15, 1976, respectively. Helios-B flew 3,000,000 kilometres (1,900,000 mi) closer to the Sun than Helios-A, achieving perihelion on April 17, 1976, at a record distance of 43.432 million km (26,987,000 mi; 0.29032 AU), closer than the orbit of Mercury. Helios-B was sent into orbit 13 months after the launch of Helios-A. Helios-B performed the closest flyby of the Sun of any spacecraft until Parker Solar Probe in 2018, 0.29 AU (43.432 million km) from the Sun.

The Helios space probes completed their primary missions by the early 1980s, but continued to send data until 1985.

== Scientific instruments and investigations ==
Both Helios probes had ten scientific instruments and two passive science investigations using the spacecraft telecommuniction system and the spacecraft orbit.

=== Plasma experiment investigation ===
Measures the velocity and distribution of solar wind plasma. Developed by the Max Planck Institute for Aeronomy for the study of low-energy particles. Data collected included the density, speed, and temperature of the solar wind. Measurements were taken every minute, with the exception of flux density, which occurred every 0.1 seconds to highlight irregularities in plasma waves. Instruments used included:

- Electron detector
- Detector for protons and heavy particles
- An analyzer for protons and alpha particles with energies between 231 eV and 16,000 eV

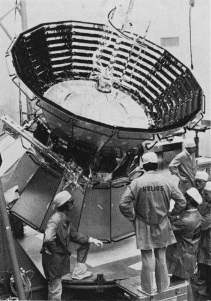
Pre-launch inspection of Helios-B

=== Flux-gate magnetometer ===
The flux-gate magnetometer measures the field strength and direction of low frequency magnetic fields in the Sun's environment. It was developed by the University of Braunschweig, Germany. It measures three-vector components of solar wind and its magnetic field with high precision. The intensity is measured with an accuracy to within 0.4 nT when below 102.4 nT, and within 1.2 nT at intensities below 409.6 nT. Two sample rates are available: search every two seconds or eight readings per second.

=== Flux-gate magnetometer 2 ===
Measures variations of the field strength and direction of low frequency magnetic fields in the Sol environment. Developed by the Goddard Space Flight Center of NASA; measures variations of the three-vector components of solar wind and its magnetic field with an accuracy to within 0.1 nT at about 25 nT, within 0.3 nT at about 75 nT, and within 0.9 nT at an intensity of 225 nT.

=== Search coil magnetometer ===
The search coil magnetometer complements the flux-gate magnetometer by measuring the magnetic fields between 0 and 3 kHz. Also developed by the University of Braunschweig, it detects fluctuations in the magnetic field in the 5 Hz to 3000 Hz range. The spectral resolution is performed on the probe's rotation axis.

=== Plasma wave investigation ===
The Plasma Wave Investigation developed by the University of Iowa uses two 15 m antennas forming an electric dipole for the study of electrostatic and electromagnetic waves in the solar wind plasma in frequencies between 10 Hz and 3 MHz.

=== Cosmic radiation investigation ===
The Cosmic Radiation Investigation developed by Kiel University sought to determine the intensity, direction, and energy of the protons and heavy constituent particles in radiation to determine the distribution of cosmic rays. The three detectors (semiconductor detector, scintillation counter, and Cherenkov detector) were encapsulated in an anti-coincidence detector.

=== Cosmic ray instrument ===
The Cosmic Ray Instrument developed at the Goddard Space Flight Center measures the characteristics of protons with energies between 0.1 and 800 MeV and electrons with energies between 0.05 and 5 MeV. It uses three telescopes, which cover the ecliptic plane. A proportional counter studies the X-rays from the Sun.

=== Low energy electron and proton spectrometer ===
Developed by the Max Planck Institute for Aeronomy, the low energy electron and proton spectrometer uses spectrometers to measure particle characteristics (protons) with energies between 20 keV and 2 MeV and electrons and positrons with an energy between 80 keV and 1 MeV.

=== Zodiacal light photometer ===
The Zodiacal light instrument includes three photometers developed by the Max Planck Institute for Astronomy to measure the intensity and polarization of the zodiac light in white light and in the 550 nm and 400 nm wavelength bands, using three telescopes whose optical axes form angles of 15, 30, and 90° to the ecliptic. From these observations, information is obtained about the spatial distribution of interplanetary dust and the size and nature of the dust particles.

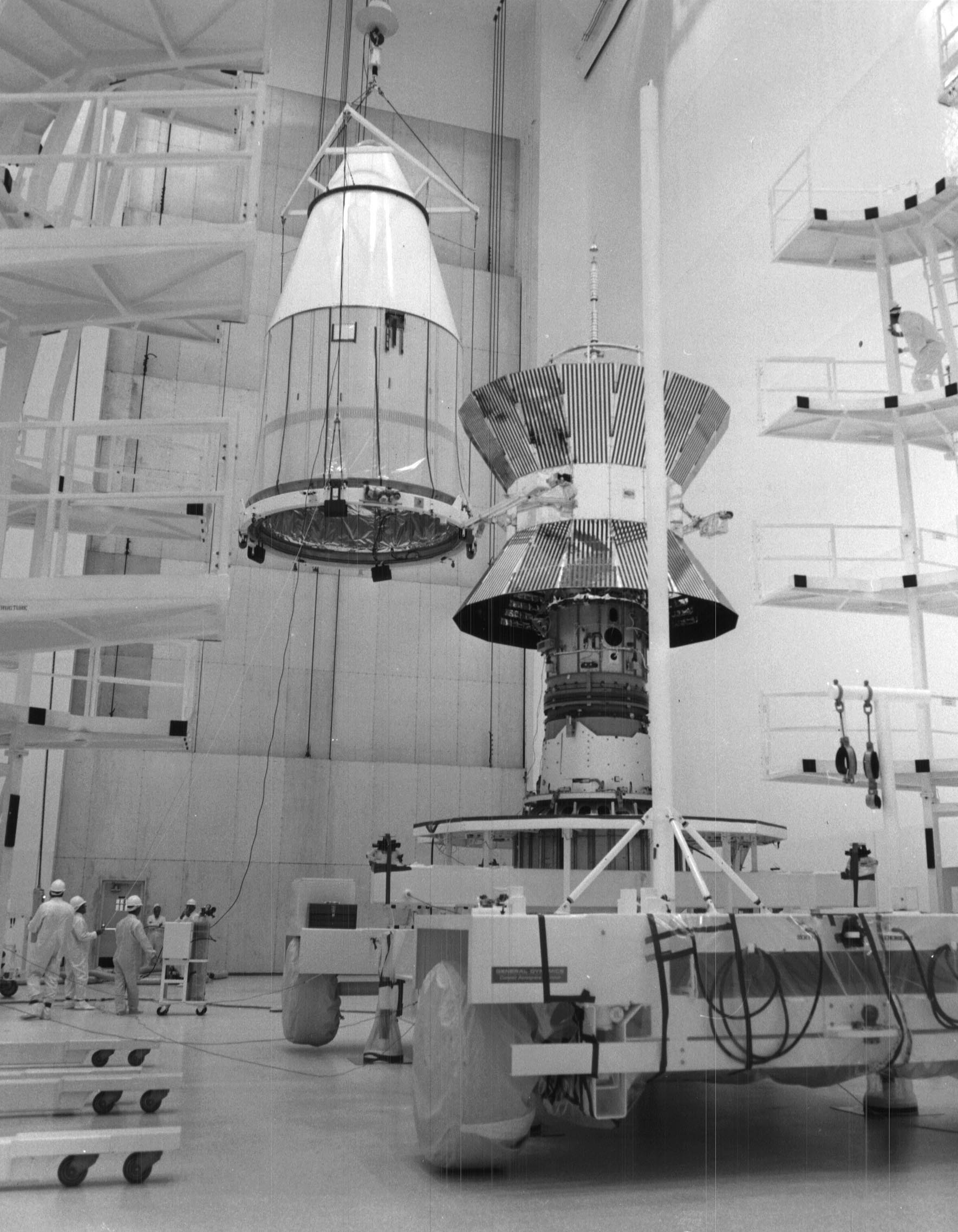
A Helios probe being encapsulated for launch

=== Micrometeoroid analyzer ===
The Micrometeoroid analyzer developed by the Max Planck Institute for Nuclear Physics is capable of detecting cosmic dust particles if their mass is greater than 10^{−15} g. It can determine the mass and energy of a micro-meteorite greater than 10^{−14} g. These measurements are made by exploiting the fact that micrometeorites vaporize and ionize when they hit a target. The instrument separates the ions and electrons in the plasma generated by the impacts, and measures the mass and energy of the incident particle. A low-resolution mass spectrometer determines the composition of impacting cosmic dust particles with a mass greater than 10^{−13} g.

=== Celestial mechanic experiment ===
The Celestial Mechanic Experiment developed by the University of Hamburg uses the Helios orbit specifics to clarify astronomical measurements: flattening of the Sun; verification of predicted general relativity effects; determining the mass of the planet Mercury; the Earth–Moon mass ratio; and the integrated electron density between the Helios spacecraft and the data receiving station on Earth.

=== Coronal sounding experiment ===
The Coronal Sounding Experiment developed by the University of Bonn measures the rotation (Faraday effect) of the linear polarized radio beam from the spacecraft when it passes during opposition through the corona of the Sun. This rotation is a measure of the density of electrons and the intensity of the magnetic field in the traversed region.

== Mission specifications ==
=== Helios-A ===
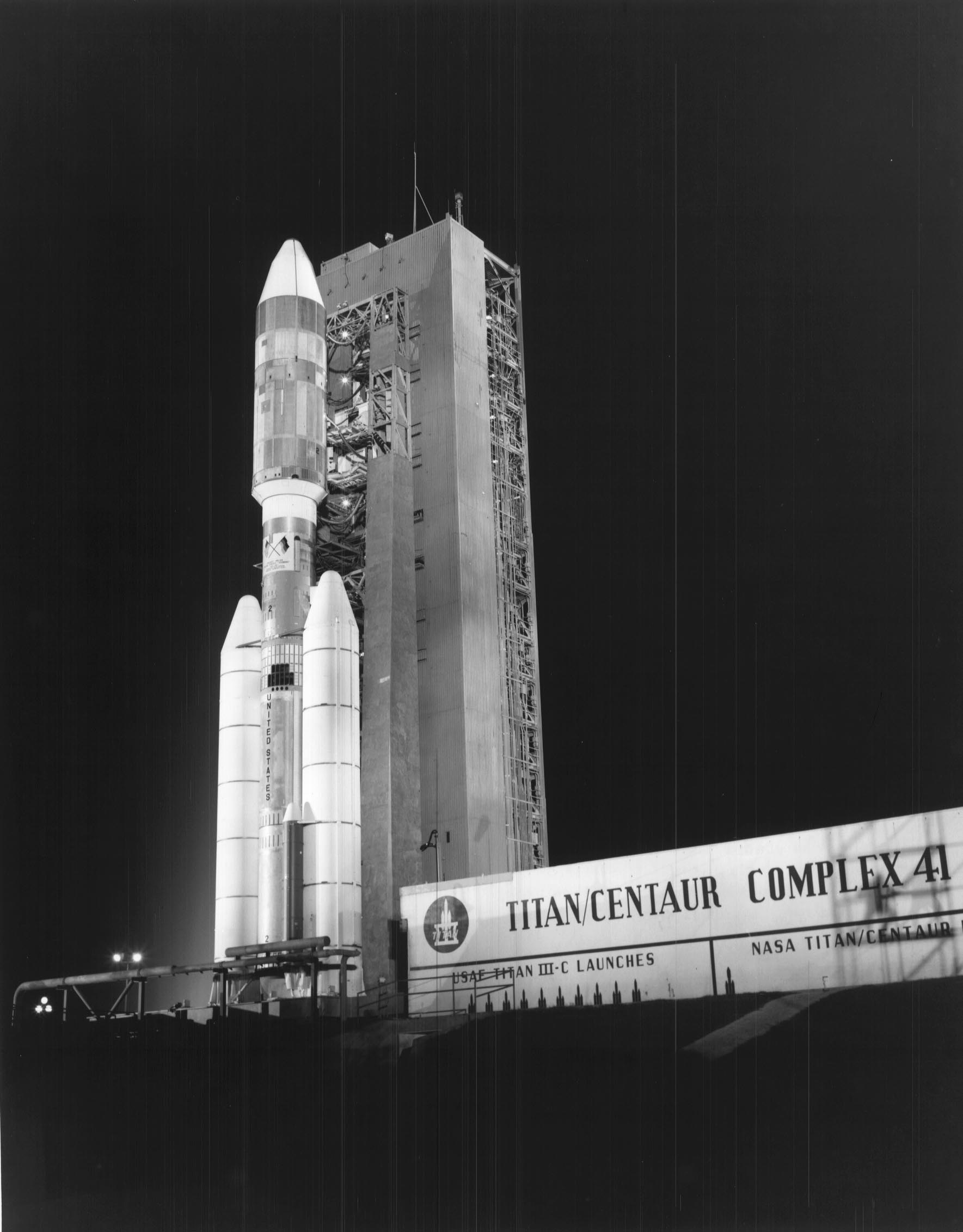
Helios-A sitting atop the Titan IIIE/Centaur rocket

Helios-A was launched on December 10, 1974, from Cape Canaveral Air Force Station Launch Complex 41 in Cape Canaveral, Florida. This was the first operational flight of the Titan IIIE rocket. The rocket's test flight had failed when the engine on the upper Centaur stage did not light, but the launch of Helios-A was uneventful.

The probe was placed in a heliocentric orbit of 192 days with a perihelion of 46,500,000 km (28,900,000 mi; 0.311 AU) from the Sun. Several problems affected operations. One of the two antennas did not deploy correctly, reducing the sensitivity of the radio plasma apparatus to low-frequency waves. When the high-gain antenna was connected, the mission team realized that their emissions interfered with the analyzer particles and the radio receiver. To reduce the interference, communications were carried out using reduced power, but this required using the large diameter terrestrial receivers already in place thanks to other space missions in progress.

During the first perihelion in late February 1975, the spacecraft came closer to the Sun than any previous spacecraft. The temperature of some components reached more than 100 °C (212 °F), while the solar panels reached 127 °C (261 °F), without affecting probe operations. During the second pass on September 21, however, temperatures reached 132 °C (270 °F), which affected the operation of certain instruments.

=== Helios-B ===
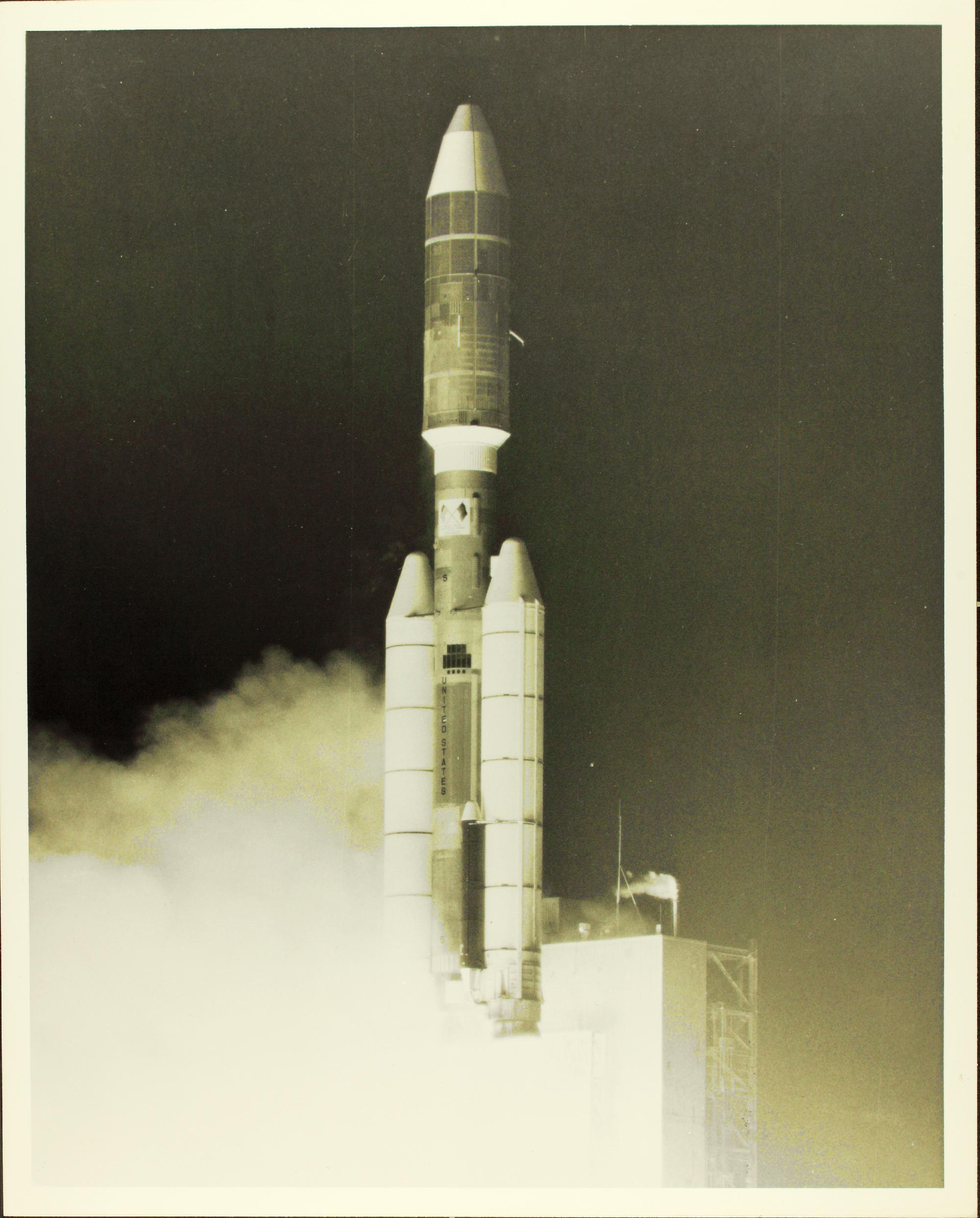
Launch of Helios-B aboard a Titan IIIE/Centaur rocket

Before Helios-B was launched, some modifications were made to the spacecraft based on lessons learned from the operations of Helios-A. The small engines used for attitude control were improved. Changes were made to the implementation mechanism of the flexible antenna and high gain antenna emissions. The X-ray detectors were improved so that they could detect gamma ray bursts, allowing them to be used in conjunction with Earth-orbiting satellites to triangulate the location of the bursts. As temperatures on Helios-A were always greater than 20 °C (36 °F) below the design maximum at perihelion, it was decided that Helios-B would orbit even closer to the Sun, and the thermal insulation was enhanced to allow the satellite to resist 15 percent higher temperatures.

Tight schedule constraints pressed on the Helios-B launch in early 1976. Facilities damaged during the launch of the Viking 2 spacecraft in September 1975 had to be repaired, while the Viking landing on Mars in summer 1976 made the Deep Space Network antennas that Helios-B needed to conduct its science while at perihelion unavailable.

Helios-B was launched on January 10, 1976, using a Titan IIIE rocket. The probe was placed in an orbit with a 187-day period and a perihelion of 43,500,000 km (27,000,000 mi; 0.291 AU). The orientation of Helios-B with respect to the ecliptic was reversed 180 degrees compared to Helios-A so that the micrometeorite detectors could have 360 degree coverage. On April 17, 1976, Helios-B made its closest pass of the Sun at a record heliocentric speed of 70 kilometres per second (250,000 km/h; 160,000 mph). The maximum recorded temperature was 20 °C (36 °F) higher than measured by Helios-A.

=== End of operations ===
The primary mission of each probe spanned 18 months, but they operated much longer. On March 3, 1980, four years after its launch, the radio transceiver on Helios-B failed. On January 7, 1981, a stop command was sent to prevent possible radio interference during future missions. Helios-A continued to function normally, but with the large-diameter DSN antennae not available, data was collected by small diameter antennae at a lower rate. By its 14th orbit, Helios-A's degraded solar cells could no longer provide enough power for the simultaneous collection and transmission of data unless the probe was close to its perihelion. In 1984, the main and backup radio receivers failed, indicating that the high-gain antenna was no longer pointed towards Earth. The last telemetry data was received on February 10, 1986.

== Mission results ==
Trajectory of the Helios space probes

Both probes collected important data about solar wind processes and the particles that make up the interplanetary medium and cosmic rays. These observations were made over a period from solar minimum in 1976 to a solar maximum in the early 1980s.

The observation of the zodiacal light established some of the properties of interplanetary dust present between 0.1 and 1 AU from the Sun, such as their spatial distribution, color and polarization. The amount of dust was observed to be 10 times that around the Earth. Heterogeneous distribution was generally expected due to the passage of comets, but observations have not confirmed this.

Helios collected data about comets, observing the passage of C/1975 V1 (West) in 1976, C/1978 H1 (Meir) in November 1978 and C/1979 Y1 (Bradfield) in February 1980. During the last event, the probe detected disturbances in solar wind later explained by a break in the comet's tail. The plasma analyzer showed that the acceleration phenomena of the high-speed solar wind were associated with the presence of coronal holes. This instrument also detected, for the first time, helium ions isolated in the solar wind. In 1981, during the peak of solar activity, the data collected by Helios-A at a short distance from the Sun helped to complete visual observations of coronal mass ejections performed from the Earth's orbit. Data collected by Helios magnetometers supplemented data collected by Pioneer and Voyager and were used to determine the direction of the magnetic field at staggered distances from the Sun.

The radio and plasma wave detectors were used to detect radio explosions and shock waves associated with solar flares, usually during solar maximum. The cosmic ray detectors studied how the Sun and interplanetary medium influenced the spread of the same rays, of solar or galactic origin. The cosmic ray gradient, as a function of distance from the Sun, was measured. These observations, combined with those made by Pioneer 11 between 1977 and 1980 in a distance of 12–23 AU from the Sun produced a good model of this gradient. Some features of the inner solar corona were measured during occultations. For this purpose, either a radio signal was sent from the spacecraft to Earth or the ground station sent a signal that was returned by the probe. Changes in signal propagation resulting from the solar corona crossing provided information on density fluctuations.

As of 2020, the probes are no longer functional, but remain in orbit around the Sun. In January 2024, a small Near-Earth asteroid was discovered and given the provisional designation 2024 BY_{15}. It was recognized as the upper stage of Helios-B in August 2025, and the designation was subsequently deleted by the Minor Planet Center.

== See also ==
- List of vehicle speed records
- Timeline of artificial satellites and space probes
