= Delayed extraction =

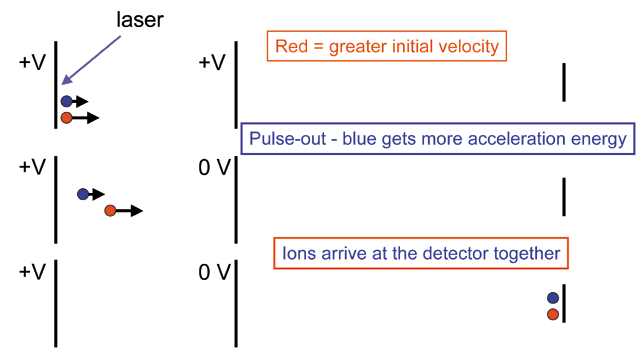
Delayed extraction with laser desorption ionization. Top: the laser fires at t=0 forming a fast "red" ion and slow "blue" ion of the same m/z, Middle: the red ion takes the lead since it has a greater velocity (and kinetic energy) but since it is farther from the acceleration plate at voltage +V, it gains less energy than the blue ion. Bottom: The blue ion has gained sufficient energy such that it arrives at the detector at the same time as the red ion.

Delayed extraction is a method used with a time-of-flight mass spectrometer in which the accelerating voltage is applied after some short time delay following pulsed laser desorption/ionization from a flat surface of target plate or, in other implementation, pulsed electron ionization or Resonance enhanced multiphoton ionization in some narrow space between two plates of the ion extraction system. The extraction delay can produce time-of-flight compensation for ion energy spread and improve mass resolution.

== Implementation ==
Resolution can be improved in time-of-flight mass spectrometer with ions produced at high vacuum conditions (better than few microTorr) by allowing the initial packet ions to spread in space due to their translational energy before being accelerated into the flight tube. With ions produced by electron ionization or laser ionization of atoms or molecules from a rarefied gas, this is referred to as "time-lag focusing". With ions produced by laser desorption/ionization or MALDI from a conductive surface of target plate, this is referred as "delayed extraction."

With delayed extraction, the mass resolution is improved due to the correlation between velocity and position of the ions after those have been produced in the ion source. Ions produced with greater kinetic energy have a higher velocity and during the delay time move closer to the extraction electrode before the accelerating voltage is applied across the target or pulsed electrode. The slower ions with less kinetic energy stay closer to a surface of the target electrode or pulsed electrode when the accelerating voltage is applied and therefore start being accelerated at a greater potential compared to the ions farther from the target electrode. With the proper delay time, the slower ions will receive enough extra potential energy to catch the faster ions after flying some distance from the pulsed acceleration system. Ions of the same mass-to-charge ratio will then drift through the flight tube to the detector in the same time.

== See also ==
- Time of flight
