= Kordylewski cloud =

Concentrations of dust in the Earth–Moon system

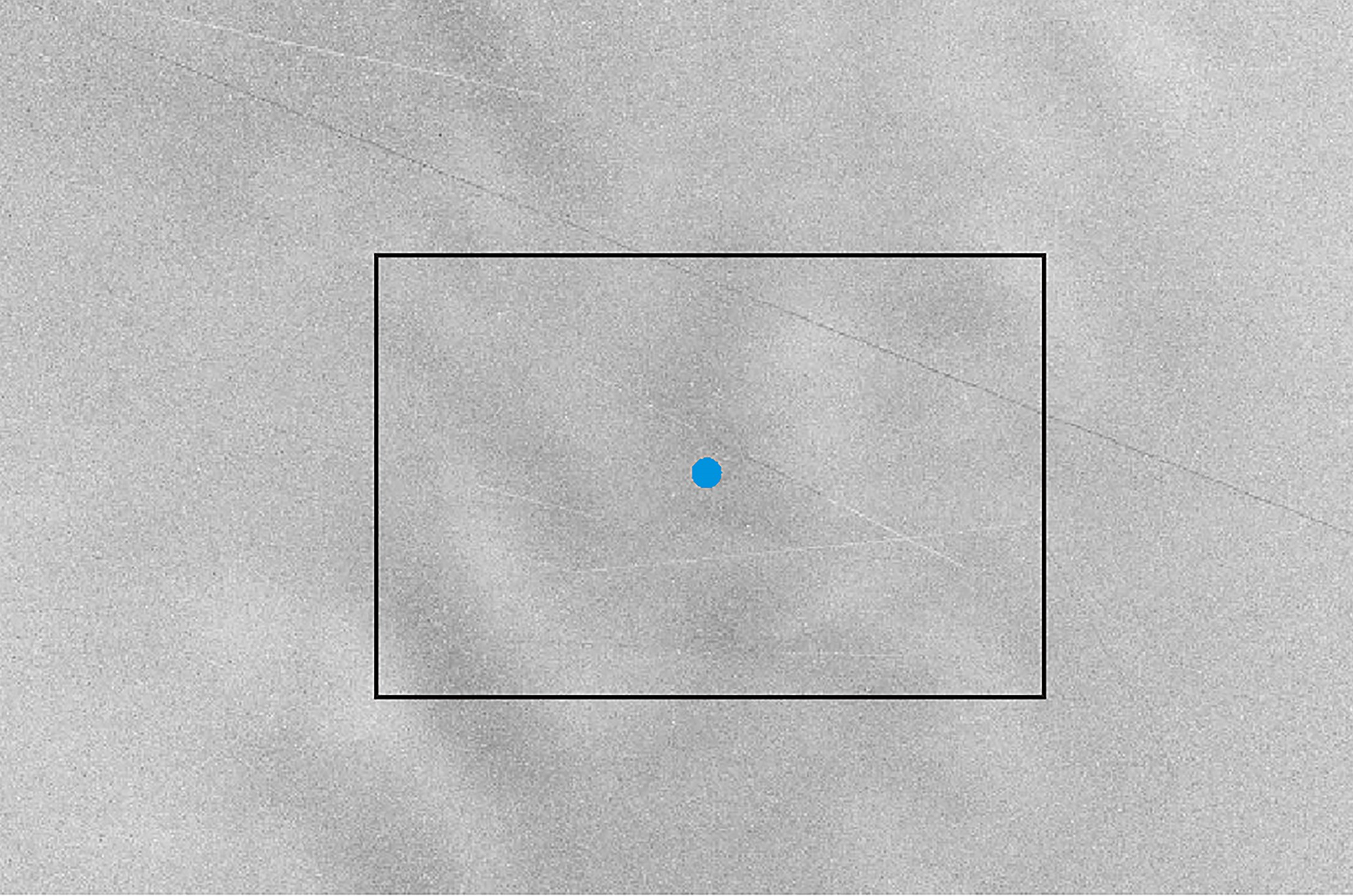
Polarimetric photograph of the L_{5} cloud on 12 August 2023. Darker shades of gray correspond to higher dust density.

The Kordylewski clouds, sometimes called the lunar libration clouds, are sparse clouds of cosmic dust that trail ahead and behind the Moon. They sit at the L_{4} and L_{5} Lagrange points, two theoretically stable regions of space in the Earth–Moon system.

Their relative stability inspired Polish astronomer Kazimierz Kordylewski to search their vicinity for co-orbital objects of the Moon. He first spotted the clouds in 1961 from the Tatra Mountains in former Czechoslovakia. Following Kordylewski's discovery, inconsistent observations by other astronomers led to the clouds' existence becoming controversial. Observation attempts were complicated by the clouds' exceedingly dim nature, making them difficult to discriminate against gegenschein and atmospheric airglow even in very dark skies. Observations from the ground, air, and space reported both positive and negative detections, and a 1991–92 encounter from Japan's Hiten spacecraft failed to find the clouds. In 2018, they were tentatively confirmed to exist via polarimetry, by a team of Hungarian astronomers of Eötvös Loránd University.

Although the lunar L_{4} and L_{5} points are relatively stable, perturbations from the Sun are able to destabilize dust particles in the clouds. They are likely replenished by material from the interplanetary dust cloud as they are temporarily trapped in the lunar Lagrange points. Dust particles remain there for decades, forming large, rapidly-evolving bands within the clouds. Eventually, perturbations from the Sun lead to their escape back into interplanetary space. Due to their elusiveness they are sometimes nicknamed ghost moons.

== History ==
=== Discovery ===
Following French astronomer Frédéric Petit's spurious report of a second moon of Earth in 1846, other astronomers began searching for undiscovered moons. Between 1953 and 1956, a team headed by Clyde Tombaugh planned to search for small natural satellites near the Moon's Lagrange points—dynamically stable regions of space—but were prevented by poor weather. In 1951, Polish astronomer Kazimierz Kordylewski began his own search for trojan satellites at the lunar L_{4} and L_{5} Lagrange points. He was also unsuccessful, but in 1956 Józef Witkowski suggested to Kordylewski to instead search for faint, diffuse dust clouds.

The clouds were first observed with the naked eye by Kordylewski in October 1956, at the Skalnaté pleso Observatory in the Tatra Mountains of former Czechoslovakia. Even with very dark skies, the clouds were difficult to observe. They appeared as slight brightenings near the lunar L_{4} and L_{5} points at least 2° in diameter and one to two magnitudes fainter than the brightest gegenschein. On 6 March and 6 April 1961, Kordylewski successfully photographed two distinct clouds at the lunar L_{5} point from Kasprowy Wierch's summit observatory. The photographs were taken using a Jupiter 3 Leica camera, with an exposure times of 11–12 minutes. Kordylewski photometrically analyzed the photographs and published his results in the journal Acta Astronomica in 1961, and an International Astronomical Union circular announced the clouds' discovery on 23 May of that year.

=== Later observations and debate ===
Further attempts to detect the Kordylewski clouds were conflicting, and their existence became controversial. Ground-based observations of the clouds are complicated by their exceedingly dim nature, making observations sensitive to weather, gegenschein, and airglow. Following Kordylewski's announcement on 1961, other professional and amateur astronomers attempted to observe the clouds, initially without success. On 4 January 1964, astronomer J. W. Simpson and his colleagues R. G. Miller and G. Gardner observed the L_{5} Kordylewski cloud. Thence until 1967, the team took about 100 photographs of the cloud. In 1966, NASA organized an airborn observations campaign, reporting detections of "circular or elliptical nebulous patches" at both Lagrange points on four flights. Other astronomers reported negative detections through optical or radar observations. From 1962 to 1963, an attempt by the United States Geological Survey to photograph the clouds from Chacaltaya, Bolivia gave inconclusive results. A photographic search for the L_{5} cloud was conducted from March 1966 to March 1967 by astronomer Robert Roosen at the McDonald Observatory failed to find any clouds. Astronomers Charles L. Wolff, Lawrence Dundelman, and Louis Charles Haughney attempted to aerially photograph the clouds, flying well away from land over the Pacific Ocean to minimize light pollution. The team did not detect any clouds.

Later observation attempts from space were conducted; space-based observations have the advantage of avoiding atmospheric airglow. In 1975, researcher J. R. Roach analyzed photographic data collected from 1969 to 1970 by the sixth Orbiting Solar Observatory telescope (OSO-6). The imagery was taken in green visible light, (Note: Data was taken at a wavelength of 5000 angstroms (500 nm), corresponding to "green" light at 498–530 nm.) revealing clouds near both Lagrange points that appeared to librate around each point. A team of researchers led by Richard H. Munro analyzed data taken by the coronograph aboard the Skylab space station, aiming to detect potential forward scattered sunlight by the clouds. No clouds could be distinguished against the solar coronal background. In 1991–1992, the Japanese Hiten spacecraft made single looping passes around the lunar L_{4} and L_{5} points, failing to detect the dust clouds with its dust counting instrument.

With mixed observational results, several astronomers expressed skepticism of the Kordylewski clouds' existence. In 1969, Roosen and Wolff published an article arguing against the existence of dust clouds within the Earth–Moon system, asserting on theoretical grounds that any such clouds would be unstable and destroyed by perturbations from the Sun or from the Moon's orbital eccentricity. Instead, they suggested that reported positive detections may be due to passing interplanetary dust clouds. In 1970, Naosuke Sekiguchi computed the behavior of dust, stating that dust tends to disperse from the lunar Lagrange points and suggested that positive detections may have been transient dispersing clouds. A similar analysis conducted by GP. Horedt, meanwhile, was inconclusive regarding dust behavior near the Lagrange points. Other astronomers suggested the possibility that the Kordylewski clouds quickly vary in structure over time as an explanation to conflicting ground observations. Successful reported observations of a cloud at the L_{5} point are around three times more common than those for the L_{4} point.

=== Current status ===
The Kordylewski clouds were tentatively confirmed in 2018 by a team of astronomers led by Judit Slíz-Balogh. The team first developed computer models to simulate the L_{5} cloud's appearance in polarimetric observations from Earth. Polarimetric observations of the area around the L_{5} point were then conducted over several months in 2017 at a private observatory in Badacsonytördemic, Hungary. As a control, the same region of sky was photographed when thin cirrus clouds and contrails passed overhead or when the L_{5} point was not in view. Using a CCD camera with three linearly polarizing filters attached to its lens, the team successfully photographed L_{5} features with polarization characteristics consistent with light scattered by dust clouds. When compared against the control photographs, the polarization characteristics differed from those expected of clouds, contrails, or zodiacal dust. Slíz-Balogh's team then compared their photographs of the clouds to their earlier computer models, finding that the photographed cloud structures matched predictions. The team published their confirmation of the clouds' existence in the Monthly Notices of the Royal Astronomical Society in 2018.

A followup observation campaign was led by Slíz-Balogh on 31 October 2021 and 3 July 2022, targeting both the L_{4} and L_{5} points. Using the same methods and location as the 2017 observations, the L_{4} and L_{5} clouds were successfully photographed.

== Properties ==
=== Structure and variability ===
Diagram showing the Lagrangian points of the Earth–Moon system. Kordylewski clouds exist in the regions of L_{4} and L_{5}.

The Kordylewski clouds are large and heterogeneous structures, with ground-based observations suggesting an apparent diameter of several degrees. (Note: For comparison, the apparent diameter of the Moon is 0.53°.) The L_{5} cloud has an elongated, denser core about 25,000 km in size and aligned parallel to the Moon's orbital plane. A diffuse series of dusty bands or blobs extend from the center perpendicular to the ecliptic plane, giving the clouds a striped appearance in polarized light. Simulations of the clouds suggest an asymmetry, with the L_{5} cloud's core being denser than that of the L_{4} cloud.

Observations and modelling indicate that the Kordylewski clouds' structures change over time, and their structures and densities are influenced by the rate at which dust is trapped at the Lagrange points. Their structures vary over timescales as short as a few days, and they may be transient features. Modelling by Slíz-Balogh and collaborators indicate that the structure of the clouds is also controlled by different populations of trapped dust. Dust populations are trapped at different times and with different velocities, with populations older than 20–25 days forming bands. The evolution of these populations lead to bands appearing, disappearing, or changing in density. Modelling by Nathan R. Boone and Robert A. Battinger in 2021 demonstrated that the density of the clouds may also vary with respect to solar perturbations as they cause structures within the clouds to expand and collapse.

=== Dynamics and source ===
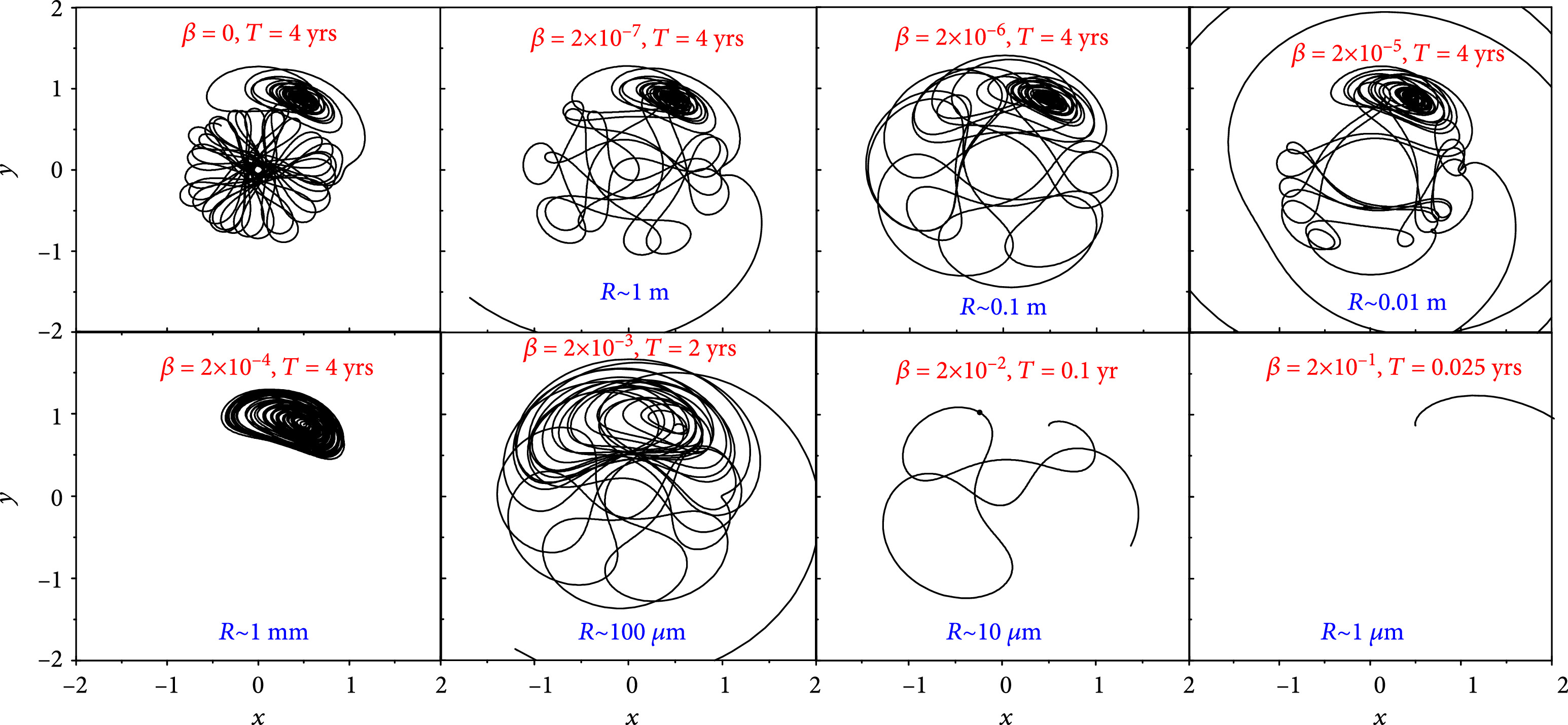
Simulated trajectories of different-sized dust particles in the L_{4} cloud in a corotating reference frame. β is a parameter describing acceleration from solar radiation pressure; it is inversely proportional to size.

The Kordylewski clouds are located near the lunar L_{4} and L_{5} points, which are 60° ahead and behind the Moon along its orbit, respectively. The clouds are not centered exactly on the L_{4} and L_{5} points; ground observations have noted the clouds displaced by 6–10° or more away from those points.

In the restricted three-body problem, the five Lagrange points represent points of equilibrium. Although points L_{1}–L_{3} are unstable, the L_{4} and L_{5} points are stable so long as the mass ratio of the primary and secondary is large enough: particles at these two points can become trapped. The mass ratio between the Earth and the Moon is great enough to ensure theoretical stability of the lunar L_{4} and L_{5} points. However, gravitational tides from the Sun and solar radiation pressure—relevant for dust particles—disrupt the stability of the lunar L_{4} and L_{5} points. Nevertheless, numerical simulations suggest that dust particles near these points are able to be temporarily captured into the Kordylewski clouds, potentially remaining for decades in small "islands of stability".

The Kordylewski clouds are likely supplied by dust from interplanetary space. The interplanetary dust cloud near Earth is quite homogeneous; despite this, models result in the L_{5} cloud trapping up to 9% more dust than the L_{4} cloud. This modelled asymmetry is similar to asymmetries in other trojan populations, but its exact cause is still unknown. Captured dust particles are initially evenly distributed within the clouds, forming bands after 20–25 days. Interactions with higher-order mean-motion resonances (like 4:3, 4:5, and 3:4) with the Moon may contribute to the formation of the bands. After becoming destabilized, dust particles then escape from the Earth–Moon system back into interplanetary space.

== Exploration ==
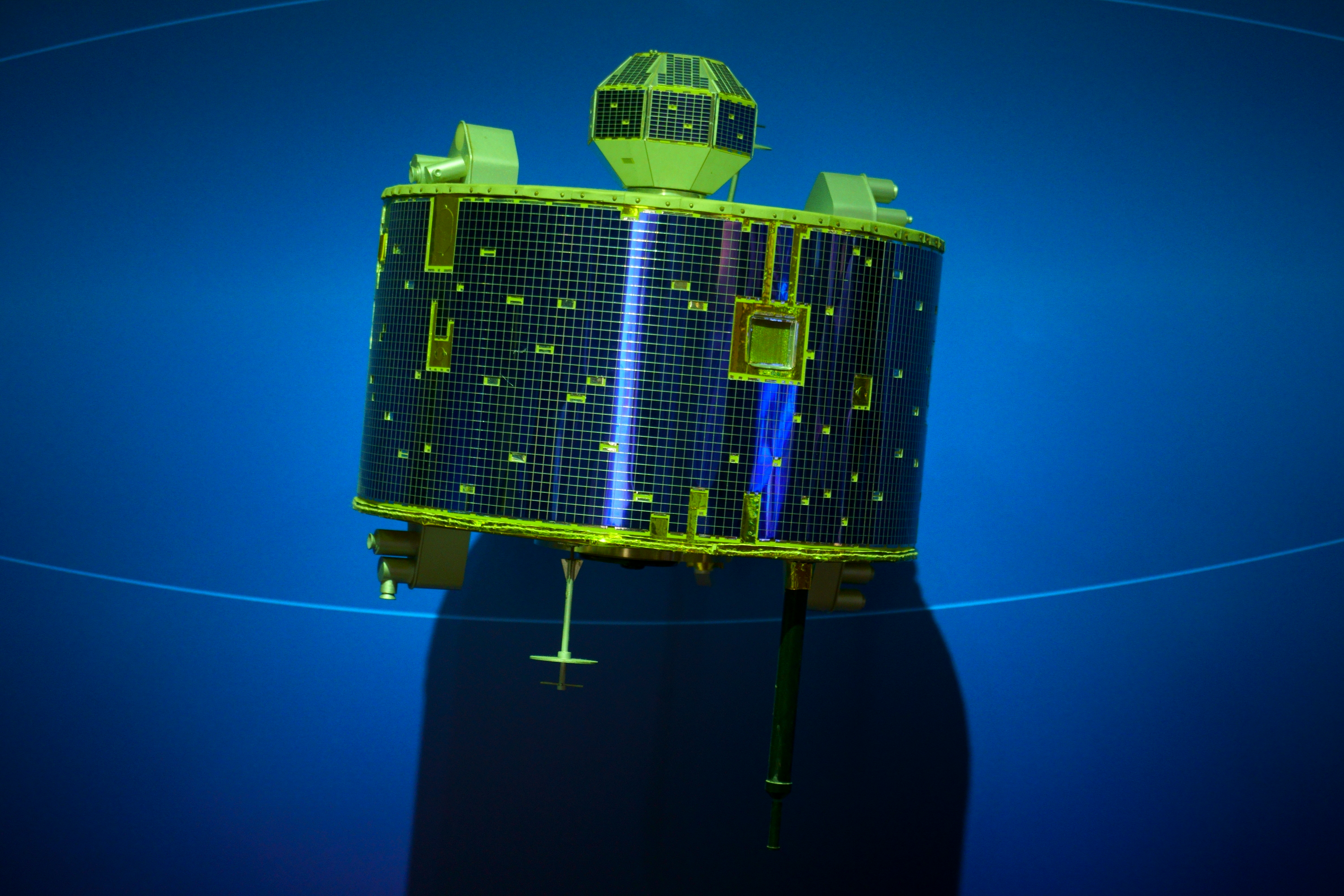
Scale model of the Hiten spacecraft

In October 1991, the Hiten spacecraft took a looping halo trajectory around the lunar L_{4} point. It then took a similar looping trajectory around the lunar L_{5} point in January 1992. Hiten was en route to the Moon as a part of its extended mission, but the encounters with the lunar L_{4} and L_{5} points were planned to search for the Kordylewski clouds using its Munich Dust Counter (MDC) instrument. No increase in dust impact rates were detected, though this could be due to the MDC's insensitivity to low-velocity dust impacts or from Hiten missing the clouds entirely.

=== Proposed missions ===
Exploration of the Kordylewski clouds was suggested as early as 1963 by Arvydas Kliore, who proposed either a flyby or rendezvous mission. A team led by Keith Ryden put forth a rendezvous mission using ion propulsion at the International Electric Propulsion Conference in 1988 using a 300 kg (660 lb) spacecraft. After parking in low Earth orbit, the probe would continuously raise its orbit in a spiral trajectory and rendezvousing with the L_{5} cloud. In 1997, N. S. Moeed and J. C. Zarnecki proposed reactivating the Giotto spacecraft, an ESA probe originally designed to flyby and study Halley's Comet, for an extended mission intercepting the L_{4} cloud. Though some of its instruments were damaged by dust impacts whilst travelling through Halley's coma, the proposal sought to use its Dust Impact Detector System to study the L_{4} cloud. Giotto was set for its second encounter with Earth on 1 July 1999. The proposal called for a correction burn six months before encounter to deflect the spacecraft towards the L_{4} cloud. Approaching at a velocity of about 3.4 km/s (2.1 mi/s), Giotto would have traversed the cloud in just under three hours. Giotto was not reactivated for its second Earth encounter.

In 2021, a team of researchers led by Peng Wang proposed a coordinated space- and ground-based observation campaign for the Kordylewski clouds. After injection into a highly eccentric orbit, the spacecraft would conduct multiple flybys of both Kordylewski clouds, sampling them with a dust counter. Ground-based observations could be used to guide the spacecraft toward the clouds' locations. A lunar flyby would be executed, setting the spacecraft to the L_{4} point. After rendezvousing with the L_{4} point, it would enter a halo orbit, further exploring the cloud's structure and dynamics.

Due to their dynamical stability, the L_{4} and L_{5} points have attracted attention for their potential to support space infrastructure for both civilian and military applications. However, the same mechanisms that trap dust in the Kordylewski clouds can also trap artificial space debris, potentially leading to a hazardous space environment within the clouds in the future. However, modelling done by Nathan R. Boone and Robert A. Battinger in 2021 showed that the likelihood of a collision from Kodylewski cloud debris is very low.

== See also ==
- Sodium tail of the Moon
- Zodiacal light
- Trojan moons of Saturn
  - Telesto and Calypso, trojans of Tethys
  - Helene and Polydeuces, trojans of Dione
