= Kazimierz Kordylewski =

Polish astronomer

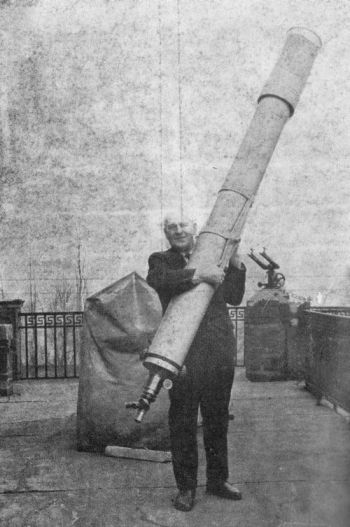
- Kordylewski in 1964
- Born: 11 October 1903; Poznań, German Empire
- Died: 11 March 1981 (aged 77); Kraków, Poland
- Education: University of Poznań; Jagiellonian University
- Known for: Discovery of the Kordylewski clouds
- Spouse: Jadwiga Pajakówna
- Children: 4
- Awards: Order of Polonia Restituta (1979)
- Scientific career
- Fields: Astronomer

Kazimierz Kordylewski (Polish pronunciation: [kaˈʑimjɛʂ kɔrdɨˈlɛfskʲi]; born 11 October 1903 – 11 March 1981) was a Polish astronomer. He is known for his discovery of the Kordylewski clouds, two clouds of dust concentrated at the Moon's L_{4} and L_{5} Lagrange points.

== Biography ==
Kazimierz Kordylewski was born on 11 October 1903 in Poznań to Francizska and Władysław Kordylewski. He attended Saint Mary Magdelene High School, where he graduated in 1922, before studying for two years at the University of Poznań. He moved to the Jagiellonian University in 1924, and earned a PhD degree in 1932.

Kordylewski was employed at the astronomical observatory of the Jagiellonian University as a junior assistant, where he worked near-continuously until his retirement in 1974. He worked frequently with eclipsing variable stars, taking over 40,000 measurements of such stars throughout his life. In December 1925, while taking observations of the eclipsing variable S Corvi, Kordylewski discovered a previously unknown variable star. Further observations determined the star to be a Mira variable, whose very red color allowed it to escape prior detection on photographic plates. The next year, he discovered the nova T Corvi.

Starting in 1951, Kordylewski began searching for trojan satellites in the Moon's L_{4} (leading) and L_{5} (trailing) points. In 1956, he claimed the discovery of the Kordylewski clouds, large transient concentrations of dust at the Trojan points of the Earth–Moon system, which were reported to have been confirmed to exist in October 2018.

Kordylewski married Jadwiga Pajak in 1929, and with her had four children. He died suddenly on 11 March 1981 in Kraków, Poland.

== See also ==
- List of Polish astronomers
- Timeline of Polish science and technology
