= Zodiacal light =

Faint solar glow caused by interplanetary dust at sunset and sunrise

Two false dawns, gegenschein (middle) and the rest of the zodiacal band of light and zodiac marked (visually crossed by the Milky Way), in this composite image of the night sky above the Northern and Southern Hemisphere

The zodiacal light (also called false dawn when seen before sunrise) is a faint glow of diffuse sunlight scattered by interplanetary dust. Brighter around the Sun, it appears in a particularly dark night sky to extend from the Sun's direction in a roughly triangular shape along the zodiac, and appears with less intensity and visibility along the whole ecliptic as the zodiacal band. Zodiacal light spans the entire sky and contributes to the natural light of a clear and moonless night sky. A related phenomenon is gegenschein (or counterglow), sunlight backscattered from the interplanetary dust, which appears directly opposite to the Sun as a faint but slightly brighter oval glow.

Zodiacal light contributes to the natural light of the sky, though since zodiacal light is very faint, it is often outshone and rendered invisible by moonlight or light pollution.

The interplanetary dust in the Solar System forms a thick, pancake-shaped cloud called the zodiacal cloud which straddles the ecliptic plane. The particle sizes range from 10 to 300 micrometres, implying masses from one nanogram to tens of micrograms.

The Pioneer 10 and Helios spacecraft observations in the 1970s revealed zodiacal light to be scattered by the interplanetary dust cloud in the Solar System. Analysis of images of impact debris from the Juno spacecraft shows that the distribution of the dust extends from Earth's orbit to the 4:1 orbital resonance with Jupiter at 2.06 AU, and suggests that the dust is from Mars. However, no other dedicated dust instrumentation on Pioneer 10, Pioneer 11, Galileo, Ulysses, or Cassini found an indication that Mars is a significant source of dust besides comets and asteroids.

== Viewing ==
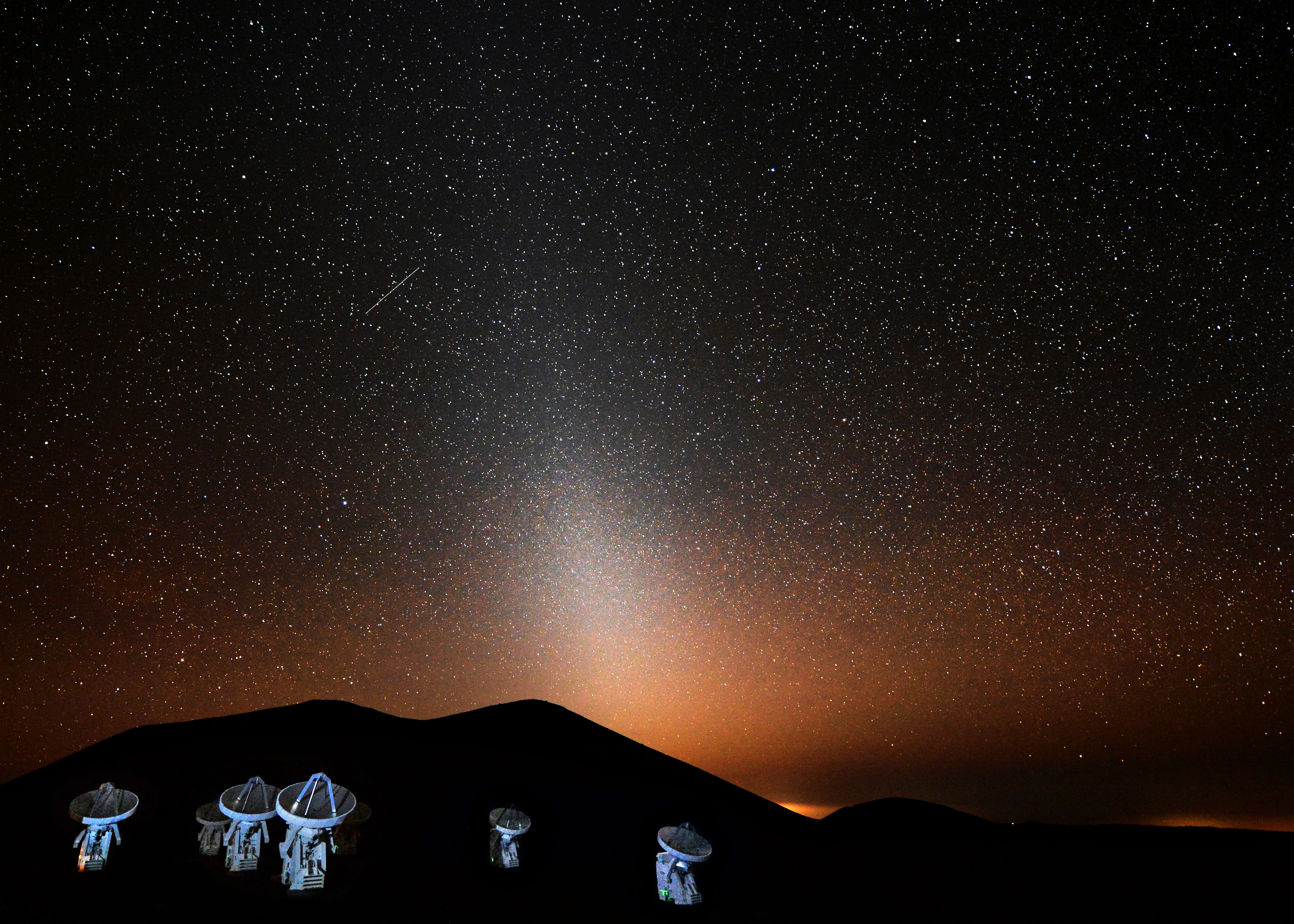
Zodiacal light seen behind the Submillimeter Array from the summit of Mauna Kea

In the mid-latitudes, the zodiacal light is best observed in the western sky in the spring after the evening twilight has completely disappeared, or in the eastern sky in the autumn just before the morning twilight appears. The zodiacal light appears as a column, brighter at the horizon and tilted at the angle of the ecliptic. The light scattered from extremely small dust particles is strongly forward scattering, although the zodiacal light actually extends all the way around the sky, hence it is brightest when observing at a small angle with the Sun. This is why it is most clearly visible near sunrise or sunset when the Sun is blocked, but the dust particles nearest the line of sight to the Sun are not. The dust band that causes the zodiacal light is uniform across the whole ecliptic.

The dust further from the ecliptic is almost undetectable except when viewed at a small angle with the Sun. Thus it is possible to see more of the width at small angles toward the Sun, and it appears wider near the horizon, closer to the Sun under the horizon.

== Origin ==
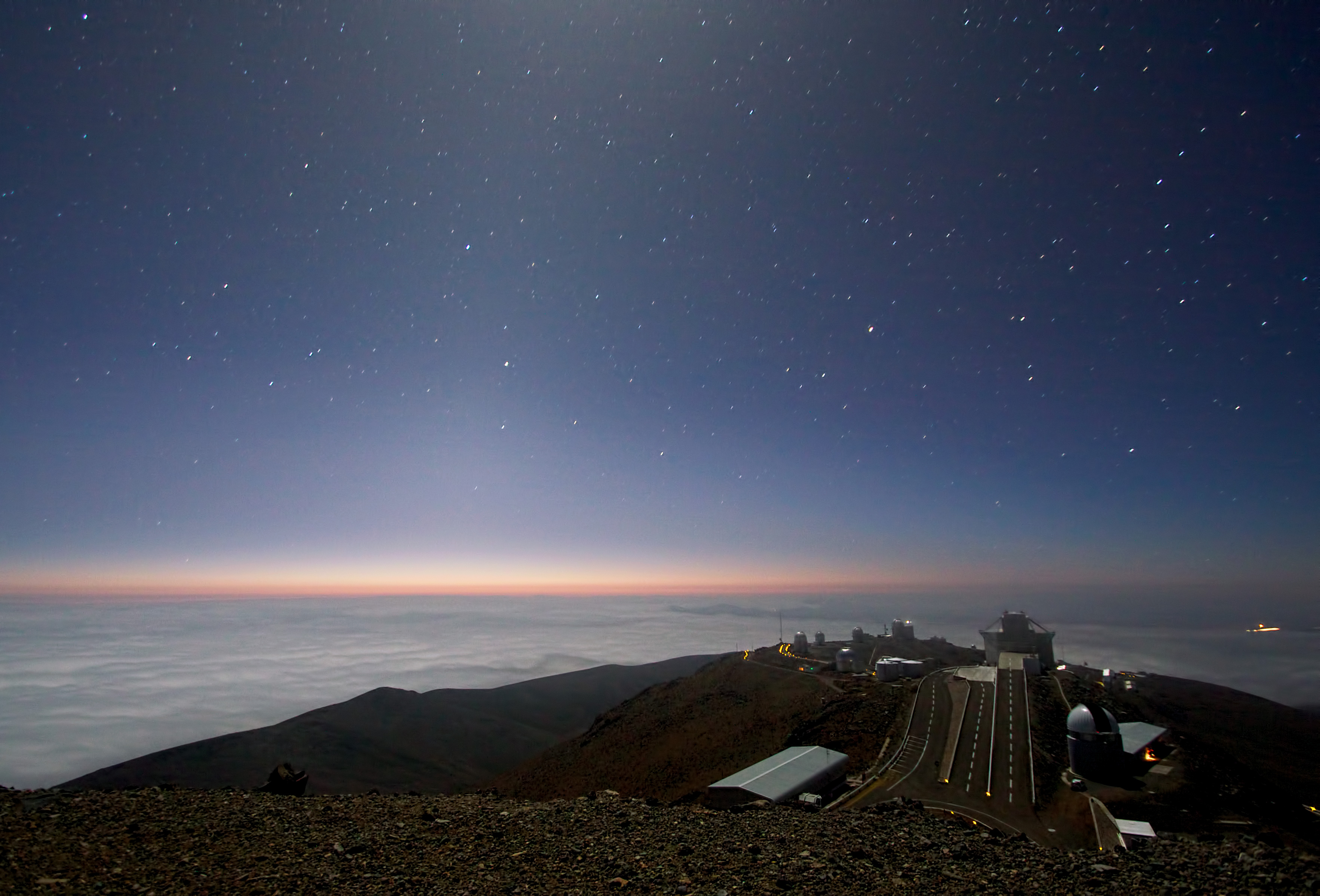
Moonlight and zodiacal light over La Silla Observatory

The source of the dust has been long debated. Until recently, it was thought that the dust originated from the tails of active comets and from collisions between asteroids in the asteroid belt. Many of our meteor showers have no known active comet parent bodies. Over 85 percent of the dust is attributed to occasional fragmentations of Jupiter-family comets that are nearly dormant. Jupiter-family comets have orbital periods of less than 20 years and are considered dormant when not actively outgassing, but may do so in the future. The first fully dynamical model of the zodiacal cloud demonstrated that only if the dust was released in orbits that approach Jupiter, is it stirred up enough to explain the thickness of the zodiacal dust cloud. The dust in meteoroid streams is much larger, 300 to 10,000 micrometres in diameter, and falls apart into smaller zodiacal dust grains over time.

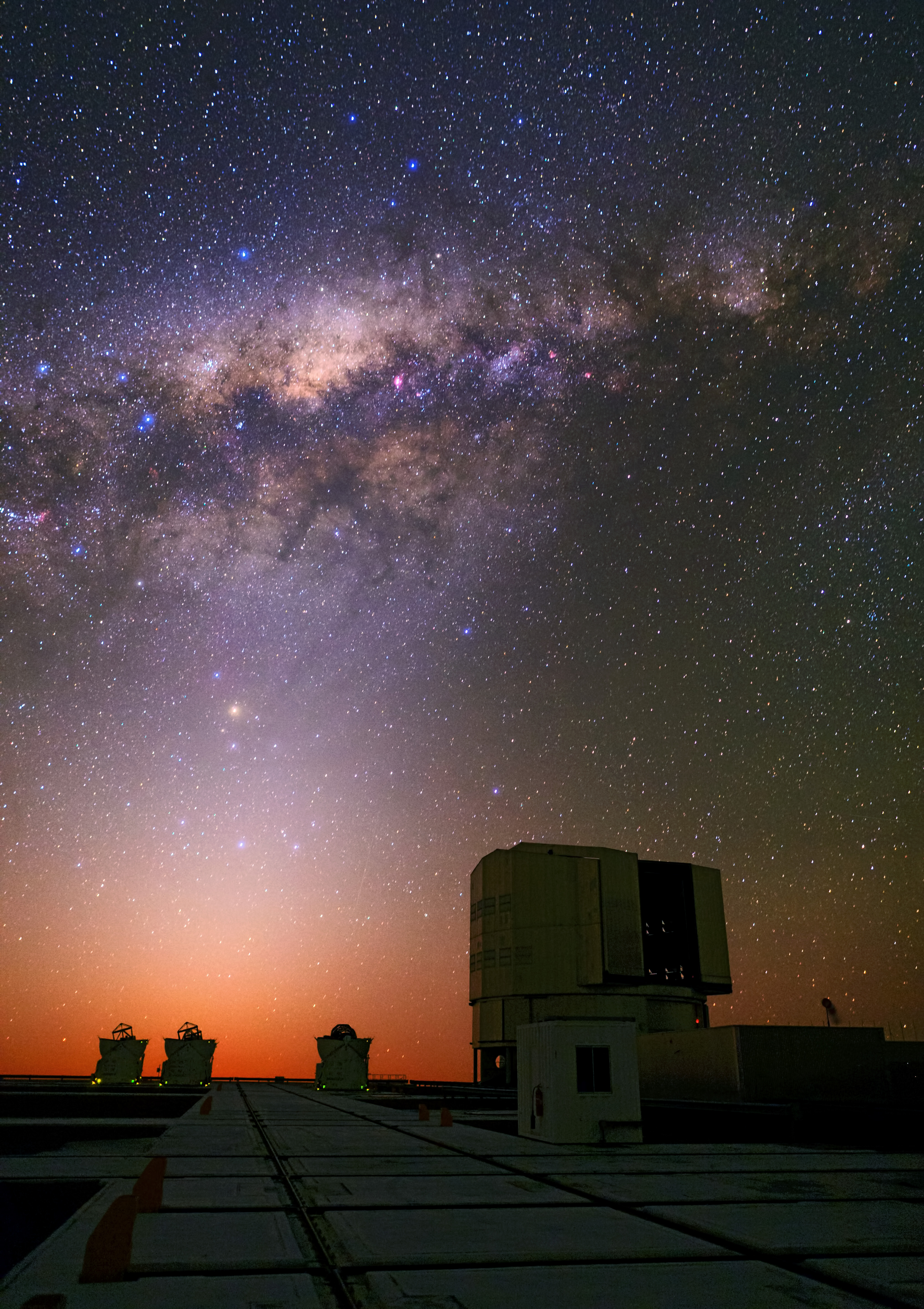
Colorful center of the Milky Way and the zodiacal light above the Very Large Telescope

The Poynting–Robertson effect forces the dust into more circular (but still elongated) orbits, while spiralling slowly into the Sun. Hence a continuous source of new particles is needed to maintain the zodiacal cloud. Cometary dust and dust generated by collisions among the asteroids are believed to be mostly responsible for the maintenance of the dust cloud producing the zodiacal light and the gegenschein.

Particles can be reduced in size by collisions or by space weathering. When ground down to sizes less than 10 micrometres, the grains are removed from the inner Solar System by solar radiation pressure. The dust is then replenished by the infall from comets. Zodiacal dust around nearby stars is called exozodiacal dust; it is a potentially important source of noise in attempts to directly image extrasolar planets. It has been pointed out that this exozodiacal dust, or hot debris disks, can be an indicator of planets, as planets tend to scatter the comets to the inner Solar System.

In 2015, new results from the secondary ion dust spectrometer COSIMA on board the ESA/Rosetta orbiter confirmed that the parent bodies of interplanetary dust are most probably Jupiter-family comets such as comet 67P/Churyumov–Gerasimenko. Data analysis from NASA's Juno mission first published in 2020 may indicate that the dust close to Earth has a local origin in the inner Solar System, best fitting the planet Mars as a source. The peer-reviewed paper used a computer model to simulate the impact of interplanetary dust particles, which fit the zodiacal light near the ecliptic. However, researchers cannot yet explain how this dust could have escaped Mars' gravitational pull.

== Appearance ==
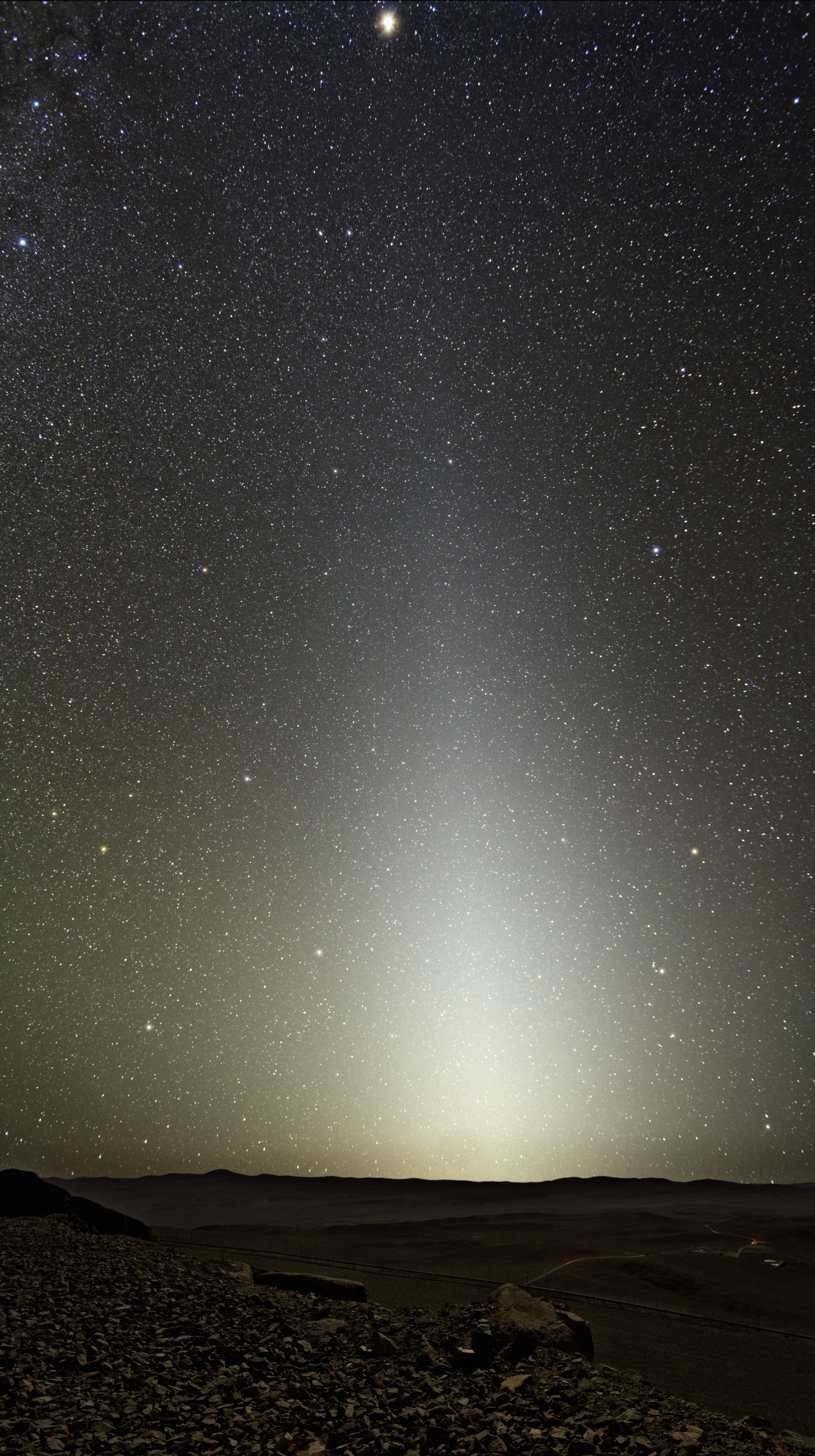
Zodiacal light seen from Cerro Paranal

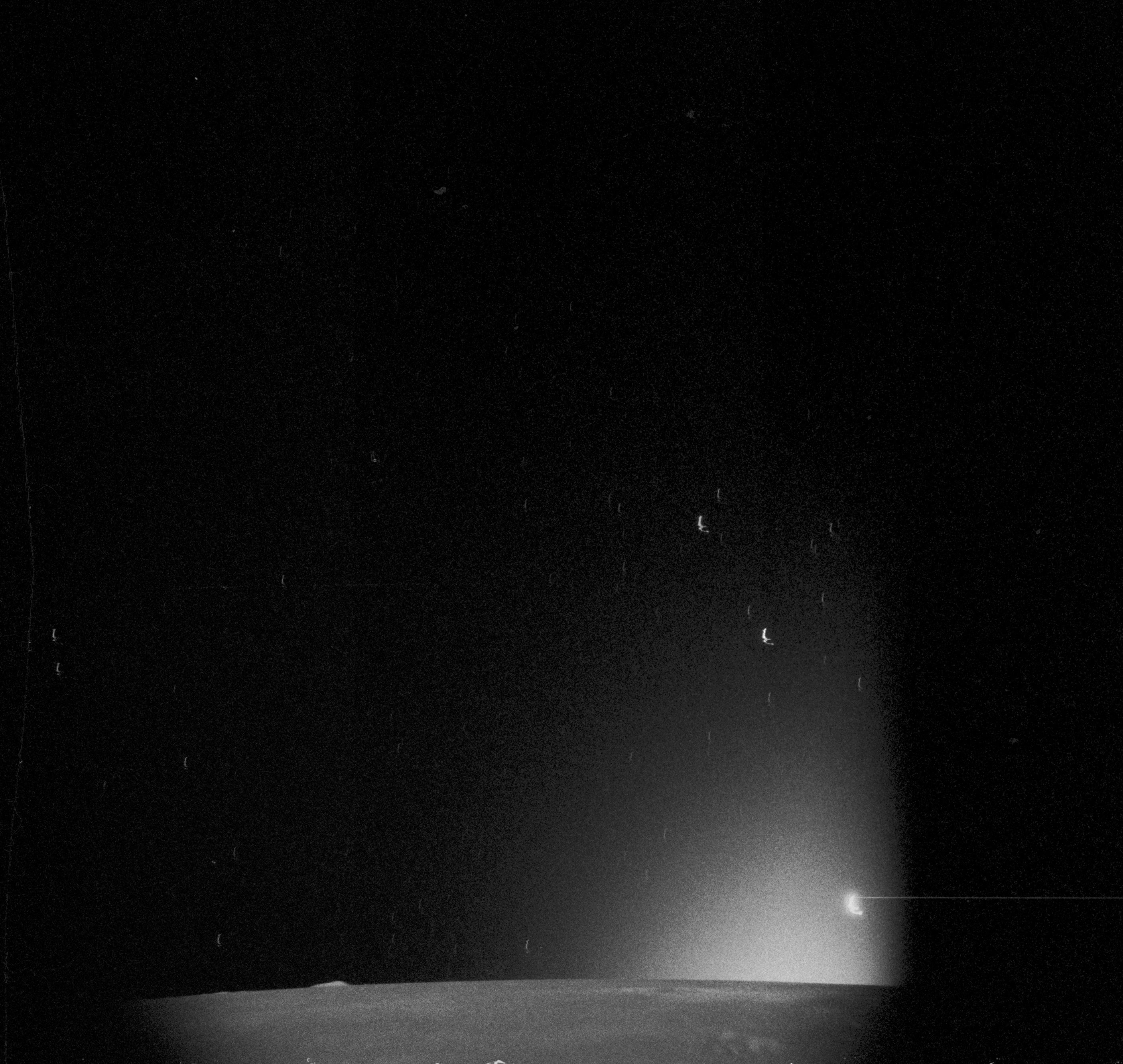
Solar corona and the zodiacal light spiking along the ecliptic where Venus is visible, the brightest blurred star-like object in the photograph, viewed from the Moon under earthshine, during Apollo 15

Zodiacal light is produced by sunlight reflecting off dust particles in the Solar System known as cosmic dust. Consequently, its spectrum is the same as the solar spectrum. The material producing the zodiacal light is located in a lens-shaped volume of space centered on the Sun and extending well out beyond the orbit of Earth. This material is known as the interplanetary dust cloud. Since most of the material is located near the plane of the Solar System, the zodiacal light is seen along the ecliptic. The amount of material needed to produce the observed zodiacal light is quite small. If it were in the form of 1 mm particles, each with the same albedo (reflecting power) as the Moon, each particle would be 8 km from its neighbors. The gegenschein may be caused by particles directly opposite the Sun as seen from Earth, which would be in full phase.

According to Nesvorný and Jenniskens, when the dust grains are as small as about 150 micrometres in size, they will hit the Earth at an average speed of 14.5 km/s, many as slowly as 12 km/s. If so, they pointed out, this comet dust can survive entry in partially molten form, accounting for the unusual attributes of the micrometeorites collected in Antarctica, which do not resemble the larger meteorites known to originate from asteroids. In recent years, observations by a variety of spacecraft have shown significant structure in the zodiacal light including dust bands associated with debris from particular asteroid families and several cometary trails.

== Cultural significance ==
According to Alexander von Humboldt's Kosmos, Mesoamericans were aware of the zodiacal light before 1500. It was perhaps first reported in print by Joshua Childrey in 1661. The phenomenon was investigated by the astronomer Giovanni Domenico Cassini in 1683. According to some sources, he explained it by dust particles around the Sun. Other sources state that it was first explained this way by Nicolas Fatio de Duillier, in 1684, whom Cassini advised to study the zodiacal light.

=== Importance to Islam ===
The Islamic prophet Muhammad described zodiacal light in reference to the timing of the five daily prayers, calling it the "false dawn" (الفجر الكاذب al-fajr al-kādhib). Muslim oral tradition preserves numerous sayings, or hadith, in which Muhammad describes the difference between the light of false dawn, appearing in the sky long after sunset, and the light of the first band of horizontal light at sunrise, the "true dawn" (الفجر الصادق al-fajr al-sādiq). According to the vast majority of Muslim scholars, navigation twilight is considered the true dawn. Practitioners of Islam use Muhammad's descriptions of zodiacal light to avoid errors in determining the timing of fasting and daily prayers.

=== Brian May ===
In 2007, Brian May, lead guitarist with the band Queen, completed his thesis, A Survey of Radial Velocities in the Zodiacal Dust Cloud, thirty-six years after abandoning it to pursue a career in music. He was able to submit it only because of the minimal amount of research on the topic undertaken during the intervening years. May described the subject as being one that became "trendy" again in the 2000s.

== Other planets ==
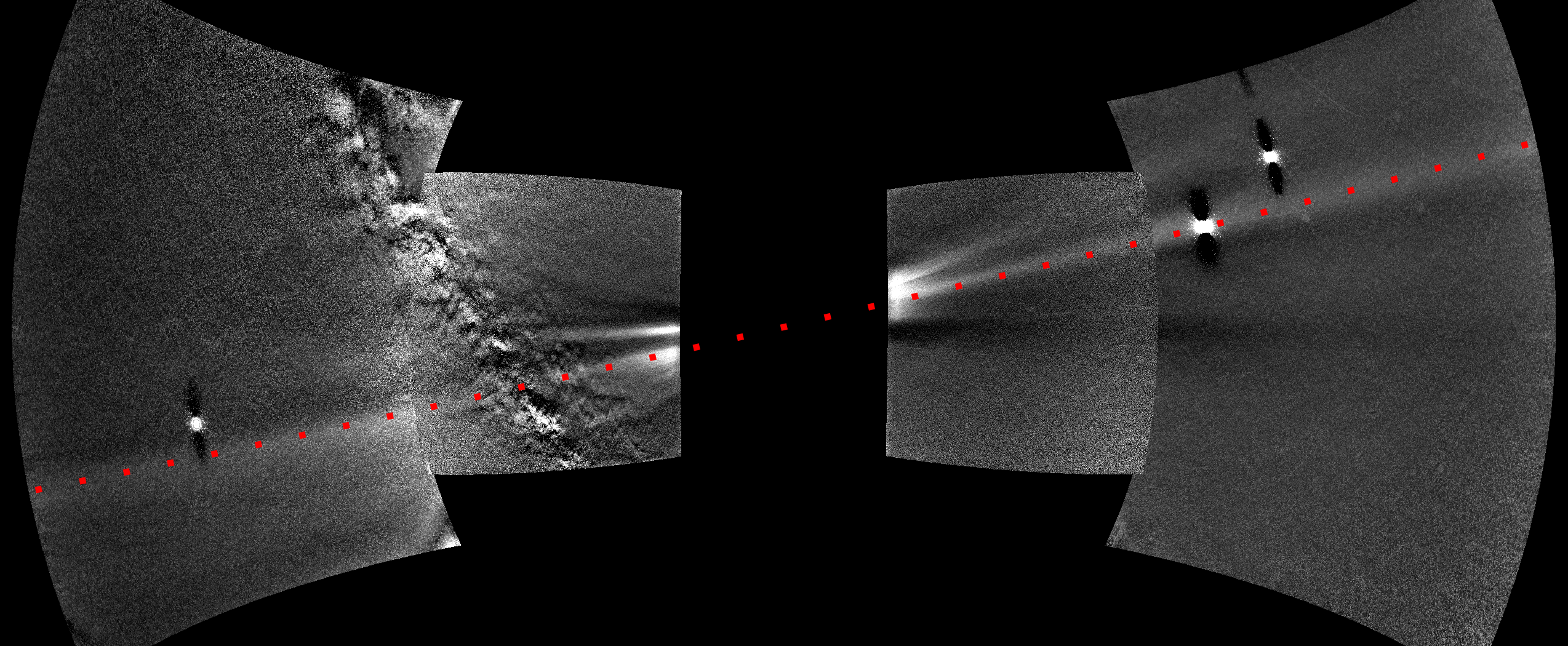
First panorama image of the dust ring of Venus's orbital space, imaged by Parker Solar Probe

Other planets, like Venus or Mercury, have shown to have rings of interplanetary dust in their orbital spaces.

== See also ==
- Exozodiacal dust
- Interplanetary dust cloud
- Kordylewski cloud
- Optical phenomenon
- Sodium tail of the Moon
- Zodi
