= Sodium tail of the Moon =

Astrochemical phenomenon near lunar orbit

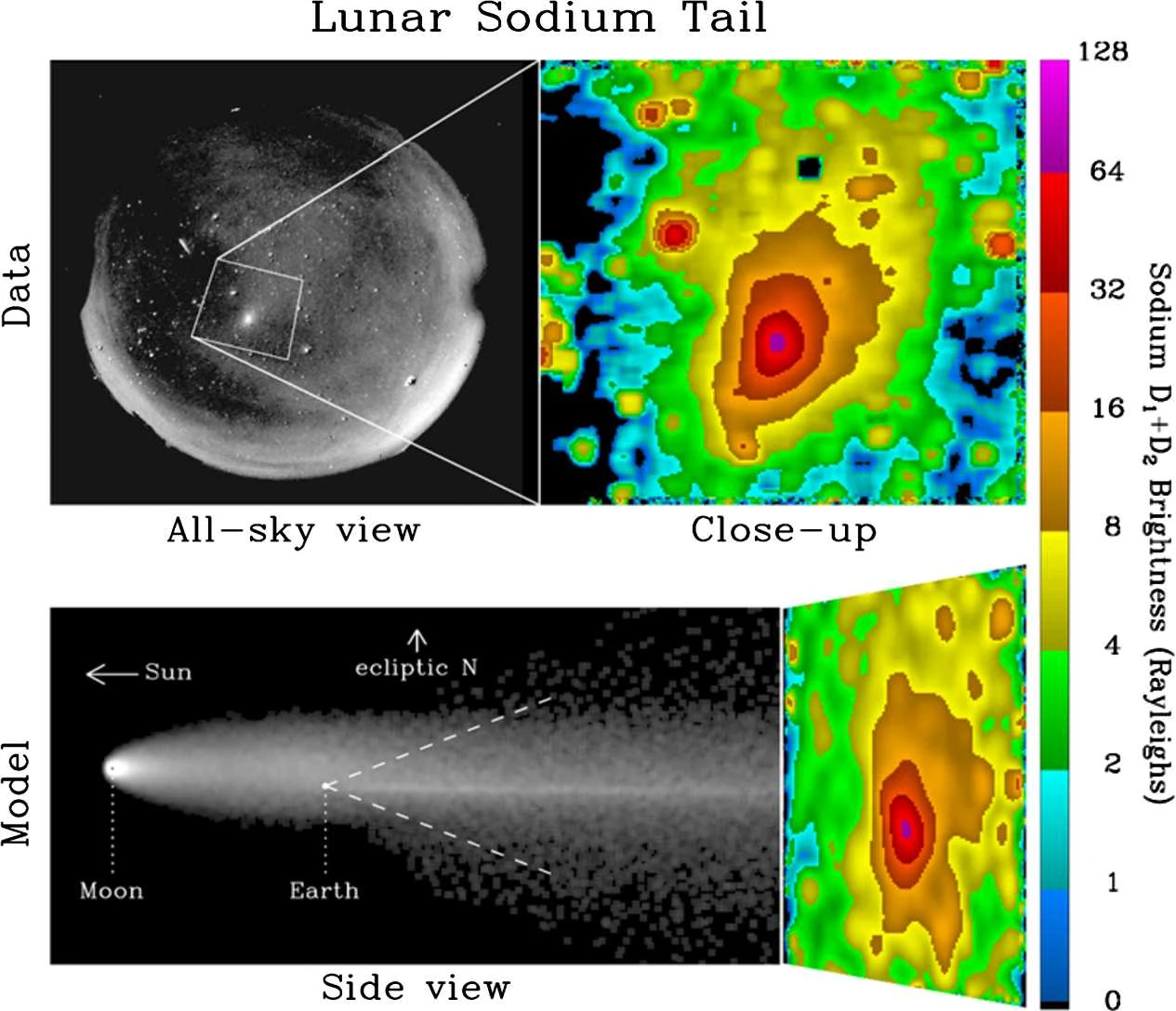
Observations and modelling of the Moon’s sodium tail “spot”.

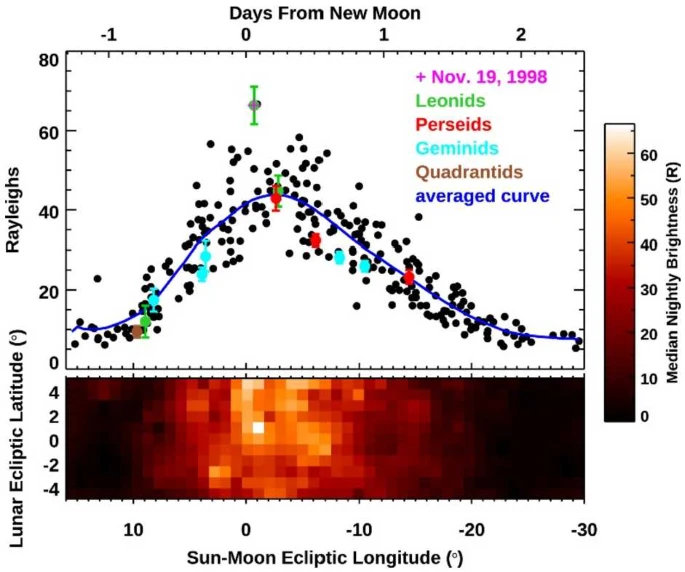
Brightness of the focused lunar tail’s spot

The Moon has a comet-like tail of sodium atoms too faint to be detected by the human eye. Hundreds of thousands of kilometers long, the feature was discovered in 1998 as a result of scientists from Boston University observing the Leonid meteor shower.

The Moon is constantly releasing atomic sodium as a fine dust from its surface due to photon-stimulated desorption, solar wind sputtering, and meteorite impacts. Solar radiation pressure accelerates the sodium atoms away from the Sun, forming an elongated tail toward the antisolar direction.

The continual impacts of small meteorites produce a constant "tail" from the Moon, but the Leonids intensified it, thus making it more observable from Earth than usual.

The Indian Space Research Organisation's (ISRO) Chandrayaan-2 mission discovered an abundance of sodium on the Moon in October 2023.

== See also ==
- Atmosphere of the Moon
- Lunar Atmosphere and Dust Environment Explorer
- Gegenschein
- Kordylewski cloud
- Zodiacal light
