= Zodi =

Unit of measurement in astronomy

The zodi is a unit of zodiacal dust. One zodi is the amount of zodiacal dust in the inner Solar System. This dust absorbs light from the Sun and re-radiates it as thermal radiation. The luminosity of the zodiacal dust in the Solar System is about $10^{-7}$ relative to the luminosity of the Sun, and in practice, this is the observable characteristic defining one zodi.

== See also ==
- Cosmic dust
