= Resolution (mass spectrometry) =

Measure of resolving power

In mass spectrometry, resolution is a measure of the ability to distinguish two peaks of slightly different mass-to-charge ratios ΔM, in a mass spectrum.

== Resolution and resolving power ==
There are two different definitions of resolution and resolving power in mass spectrometry.

=== IUPAC definition ===
The IUPAC definition for resolution in mass spectrometry is

$$R = \cfrac{M}{\Delta M} = \mathrm{resolution}$$
$$\Delta M = \mathrm{resolving\ power}$$
$$M = \mathrm{mass\ of\ the\ (second)\ peak}$$

Where a larger resolution indicates a better separation of peaks. This definition is used in a number of mass spectrometry texts. This use is also implied by the term "high-resolution mass spectrometry."

A high value for resolution corresponding to good separation of peaks is similar to the convention used with chromatography separations, although the definitions are not the same. High resolution indicating better peak separation is also used in ion mobility spectrometry.

=== Resolving power definition ===
Some mass spectrometrists use the definition that is similar to definitions used in some other fields of physics and chemistry. In this case, resolving power is defined as:

$$R = \cfrac{M}{\Delta M} = \mathrm{resolving\ power}$$

The minimum peak separation ΔM which allows to distinguish two ion species is then called:

$$\Delta M = \mathrm{resolution}$$

Resolution and resolving power, when defined in this way, are consistent with IUPAC recommendations for microscopy, optical spectroscopy. and ion microscopy (SIMS) but not gas chromatography. This definition also appears in some mass spectrometry texts.

== Measuring peak separation ==
There are several ways to define the minimum peak separation ΔM in mass spectrometry, therefore it is important to report the method used to determine mass resolution when reporting its value. The two most widely used are the peak width definition and the valley definition.

=== Peak width definition ===
In the peak width definition, the value of ΔM is the width of the peak measured at a specified fraction of the peak height, for example 0.5%, 5%, 10% or 50%. The latter is called the full width at half maximum (FWHM).

=== Valley definition ===
The valley definition defines ΔM as the closest spacing of two peaks of equal intensity with the valley (lowest value of signal) between them less than a specified fraction of the peak height. Typical values are 10% or 50%. The value obtained from a 5% peak width is roughly equivalent to a 10% valley.

== See also ==
- Resolution (electron density)
- Image resolution
