= Space dust measurement =

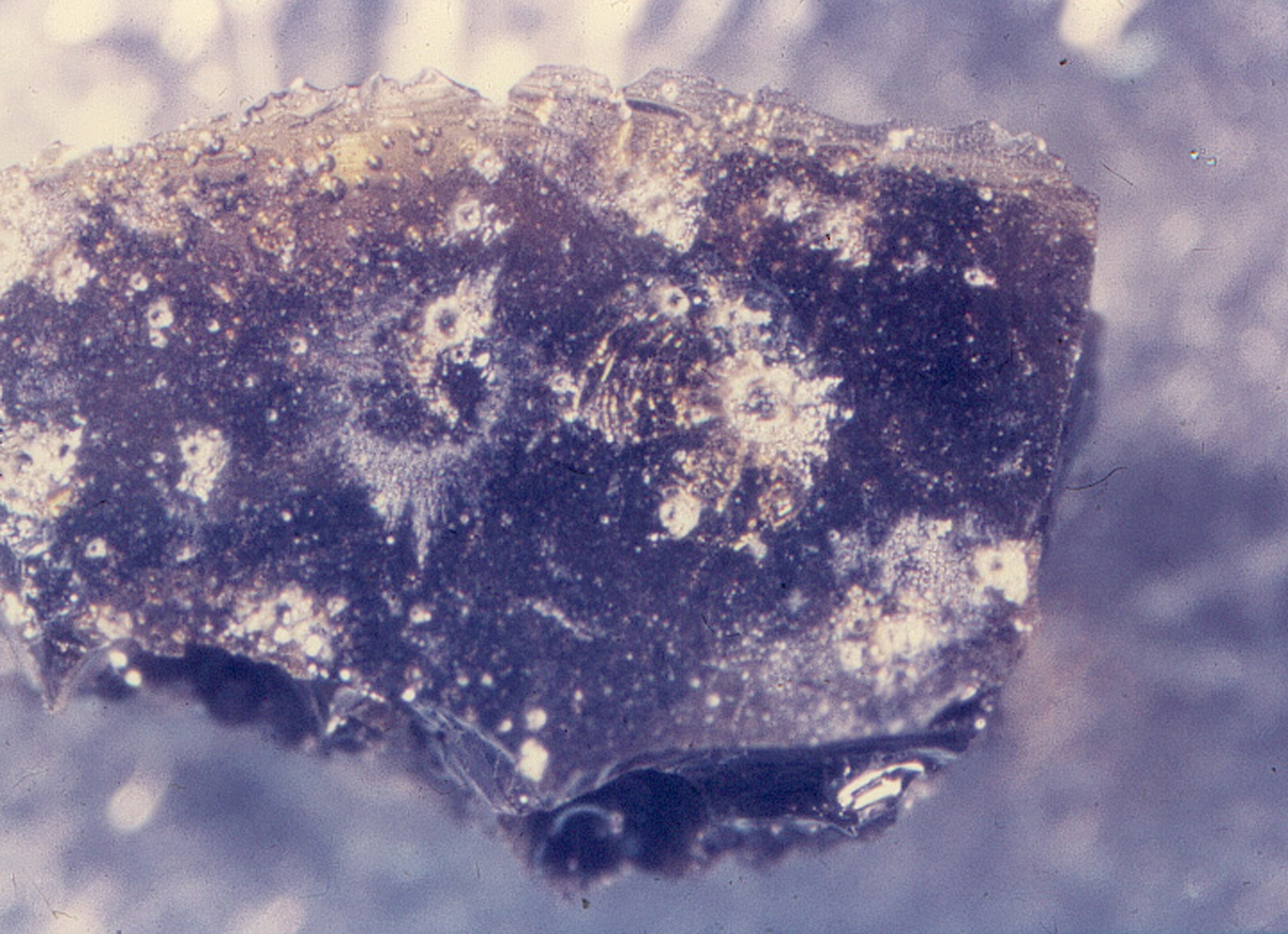
Small glassy lunar sample peppered with microcraters. The central pits are surrounded by bright spallation zones.

Space dust measurement refers to the study of small particles of extraterrestrial material, known as micrometeoroids or interplanetary dust particles (IDPs), that are present in the Solar System. These particles are typically of micrometer to sub-millimeter size and are composed of a variety of materials including silicates, metals, and carbon compounds. The study of space dust is important as it provides insight into the composition and evolution of the Solar System, as well as the potential hazards posed by these particles to spacecraft and other space-borne assets. The measurement of space dust requires the use of advanced scientific techniques such as secondary ion mass spectrometry (SIMS), optical and atomic force microscopy (AFM), and laser-induced breakdown spectroscopy (LIBS) to accurately characterize the physical and chemical properties of these particles.

== Overview ==
From the ground, space dust is observed as scattered sun light from myriads of interplanetary dust particles and as meteoroids entering the atmosphere. By observing a meteor from several positions on the ground, the trajectory and the entry speed can be determined by triangulation. Atmospheric entry speeds of up to 72,000 m/s have been observed for Leonid meteors.

Even sub-millimeter sized meteoroids hitting spacecraft at speeds around 300 m/s (much faster than bullets) can cause significant damage. Therefore, the early US Explorer 1, Vanguard 1, and the Soviet Sputnik 3 satellites carried simple 0.001 m^{2} sized microphone dust detectors in order to detect impacts of micron sized meteoroids. The obtained fluxes were orders of magnitude higher than those estimated from zodiacal light measurements. However, the latter determination had big uncertainties in the assumed size and heliocentric radial dust density distributions. Thermal studies in the lab with microphone detectors suggested that the high count-rates recorded were due to noise generated by temperature variations in Earth orbit.

An excellent review of the early days of space dust research was given by Fechtig, H., Leinert, Ch., and Berg, O. in the book Interplanetary Dust.

== Dust accelerators ==
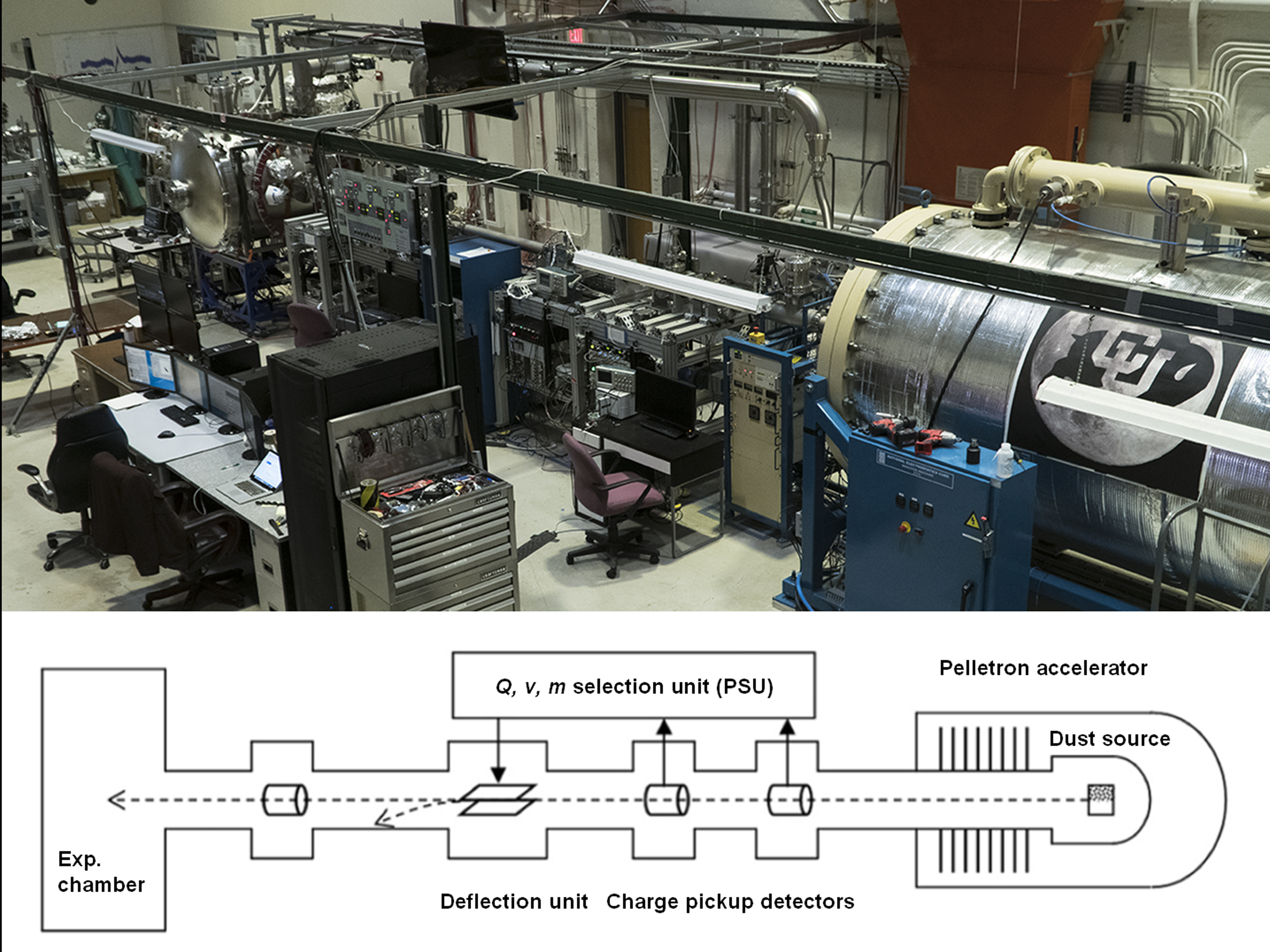
The 3 MeV dust accelerator facility at the Laboratory for Atmospheric and Space Physics, University of Colorado, Boulder

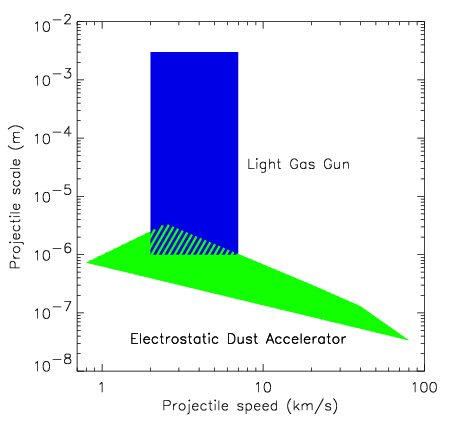
Typical projectile size and speed performances of dust accelerators

A dust accelerator is a critical facility to develop, test, and calibrate space dust instruments. Classic guns have muzzle velocities between just a few 100 m/s and 1 km/s, whereas meteoroid speeds range from a few km/s to several 100 km/s for nanometer sized dust particles. Only experimental light-gas guns (e.g. at NASA's Johnson Space Center, JSC) reach projectile speeds of several km/s up to 10 km/s in the laboratory. By exchanging the projectile with a sabot containing dust particles, high speed dust projectiles can be used for impact cratering and dust sensor calibration experiments.

The workhorse for hypervelocity dust impact experiments is the electrostatic dust accelerator. Nanometer to micrometer sized conducting dust particles are electrically charged and accelerated by an electrostatic particle accelerator to speeds up to 100 km/s. Currently, operational dust accelerators exist at IRS in Stuttgart, Germany (formally at Max Planck Institute for Nuclear Physics in Heidelberg), and at the Laboratory for Atmospheric and Space Physics (LASP) in Boulder, Colorado. The LASP dust accelerator facility has been operational since 2011, and has been used for basic impact studies, as well as for the development of dust instruments. The facility is available for the planetary and space science communities.

Dust accelerators are used for impact cratering studies, calibration of impact ionization dust detectors, and meteor studies. Only electrically conducting particles can be used in an electrostatic dust accelerator because the dust source is located in the high-voltage terminal. James F. Vedder, at Ames Research Center, ARC, used a linear particle accelerator by charging dust particles by an ion beam in a quadrupole ion trap under visual control. This way, a wide range of dust materials could be accelerated to high speeds.

== Reliable dust detections ==
Tennis court sized (200 m^{2}) penetration detectors on the Pegasus satellites determined a much lower flux of 100 micron sized particles that would not pose a significant hazard to the crewed Apollo missions. The first reliable dust detections of micron sized meteoroids were obtained by the dust detectors on board the Pioneer 8 and 9 and HEOS 2 spacecraft. Both instruments were impact ionization detectors using coincident signals from ions and electrons released upon impact. The detectors had sensitive areas of approximately 0.01 m^{2} and detected outside the Earth's magnetosphere on average one impact per ten days.

== Microcrater analyses ==
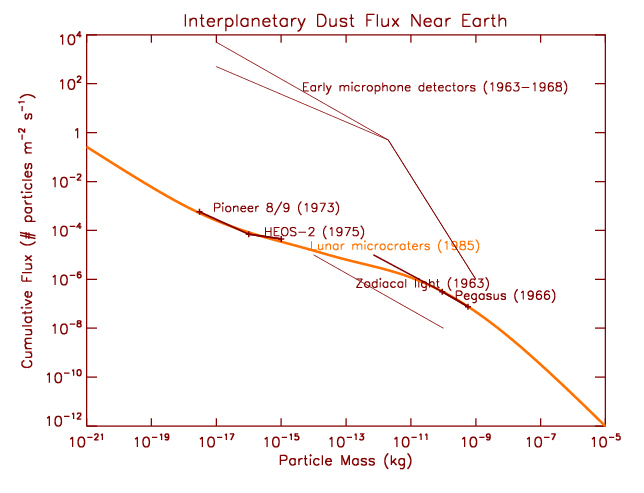
Interplanetary dust flux measured by early dust detectors or derived from ground-based zodiacal light observations and analysis of lunar microcrater counts.

Microcraters on lunar samples provide an extensive record of impacts onto the lunar surface. Uneroded glass splashes from big impacts covering crystalline lunar rocks preserve microcraters well.

The number of microcraters was measured on a single rock sample using microscopic and scanning electron microscopic analyses. The craters ranged in size from 10^{−8} to 10^{−3} m, and were correlated to the mass of meteoroids based on impact simulations. The impact speed onto the lunar surface was assumed to be 20 km/s. The age of the rocks on the surface could not be determined through traditional methods (counting the solar flare track densities), so spacecraft measurements by the Pegasus satellites were used to determine the interplanetary dust flux, specifically the crater production flux at 100 μm size. The flux of smaller meteoroids was found to be smaller than the observed cratering flux on the lunar surface due to fast ejecta from impacts of bigger meteoroids. The flux was adjusted using data from the HEOS-2 and Pioneer 8/9 space probes.

From April 1984 to January 1990, NASA's Long Duration Exposure Facility exposed several passive impact collectors (each a few square meters in area) to the space dust environment in low Earth orbit. After recovery of LDEF by the Space Shuttle Columbia, the instrument trays were analyzed. The results generally confirmed the earlier analysis of lunar microcraters.

== Optical and infrared zodiacal dust observations ==
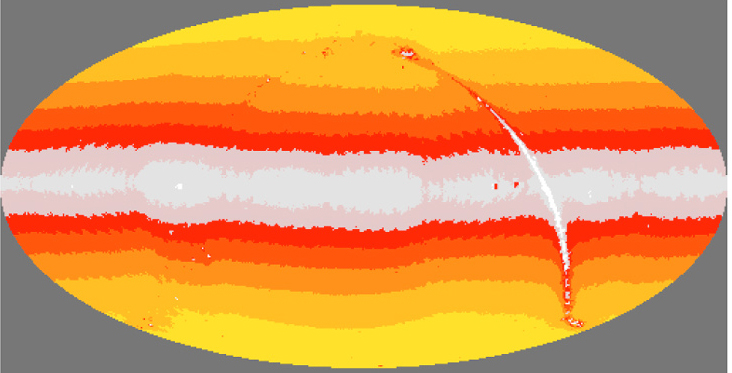
COBE/DIRBE 25 micron wavelength map of the sky in ecliptic coordinates. The narrow curved line at the right is the galactic plane.

Zodiacal light observations at different heliocentric distances were performed by the Zodiacal light photometer instruments on Helios 1 and 2 and the Pioneer 10 and Pioneer 11 space probes, ranging between 0.3 AU and 3.3 AU from the sun. This way, the heliocentric radial profile was determined, and shown to vary by a factor of about 100 over that distance. The Asteroid Meteoroid Detector (AMD) on Pioneer 10 and Pioneer 11 used the optical detection and triangulation of individual meteoroids to get information on their sizes and trajectories. Unfortunately, the trigger threshold was set too low, and noise corrupted the data. Zodiacal light observations at visible light wavelengths use the light scattered by interplanetary dust particles, which constitute only a few percent of the incoming light. The remainder (over 90%) is absorbed and reradiated at infrared wavelengths.

The zodiacal dust cloud is much brighter at infrared wavelengths than visible wavelengths. However, on the ground, most of these infrared wavelengths are blocked by atmospheric absorption bands. Therefore, most infrared astronomy observations are done from space observatory satellites. The Infrared Astronomical Satellite (IRAS) mapped the sky at wavelengths of 12, 25, 60, and 100 micrometers. Between wavelengths of 12 and 60 microns, zodiacal dust was a prominent feature. Later, the Diffuse Infrared Background Experiment (DIRBE) on NASA's COBE mission provided a complete high-precision survey of the zodiacal dust cloud at the same wavelengths.

IRAS sky maps showed structure in the sky brightness at infrared wavelengths. In addition to the wide, general zodiacal cloud and a broad, central asteroidal band, there were several narrow cometary trails. Follow-up observations using the Spitzer Space Telescope showed that at least 80% of all Jupiter family comets had trails. When the Earth passes through a comet trail, a meteor shower is observed from the ground. Due to the enhanced risk to spacecraft in such meteoroid streams, the European Space Agency developed the IMEX model, which follows the evolution of cometary particles and hence allows us to determine the risk of collision at specific positions and times in the inner Solar System.

== Penetration detectors ==
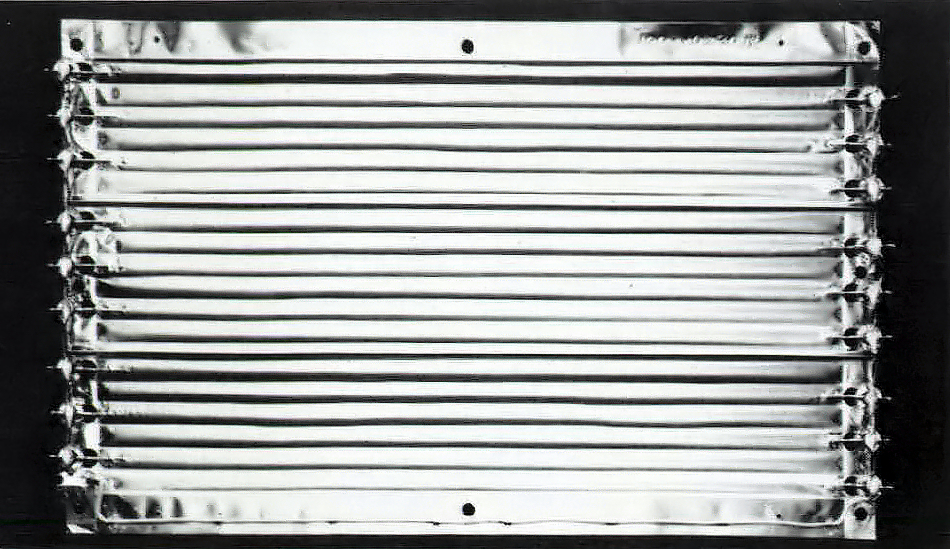
Panel of 18 pressurized cells mounted on the back of the main dish antenna of Pioneer 10 and 11

In the early 1960s, pressurized cell micrometeorite detectors were flown on the Explorer 16 and Explorer 23 satellites. Each satellite carried more than 200 individual gas-filled pressurized cells with metal walls of 25 and 50 microns thick. A puncture of a cell by a meteoroid impact could be detected by a pressure sensor. These instruments provided important measurements of the near-Earth meteoroid flux. In 1972 and 1973, the Pioneer 10 and Pioneer 11 interplanetary spacecraft carried 234 pressurized cell detectors each, mounted on the back of the main dish antenna. The stainless-steel wall thickness was 25 microns on Pioneer 10, and 50 microns on Pioneer 11. The two instruments characterized the meteoroid environment in the outer Solar System as well as near Jupiter and near Saturn.

In preparation for the Apollo Missions to the moon, three Pegasus satellites were launched by the Saturn 1 rocket into near-Earth orbit. Each satellite carried 416 individual meteoroid detectors with a total detection surface of about 200 m^{2}. The detectors consisted of aluminum penetration sheets of various thicknesses: 171 m^{2} of 400 micron-thick, 16 m^{2} of 200 micron-thick, and 7.5 m^{2} of 40 micron-thick. Placed behind these penetration sheets were 12 micron-thick mylar capacitor detectors that recorded penetrations of the overlying sheet. The results showed that the meteoroid hazard is significant and meteoroid protection methods must be implemented for large space vehicles.

In 1986, the Vega 1 and Vega 2 missions were equipped with a new dust detector, developed by John Simpson, which used polyvinylidene difluoride PVDF films. This material responds to dust impacts by generating electrical charge due to impact cratering or penetration. Since PVDF detectors are also sensitive to mechanical vibrations and energetic particles, detectors using PVDF work acceptably well as high-rate dust detectors in very dusty environments, like cometary comae or planetary rings (as was the case for the Cassini–Huygens Cosmic Dust Analyzer). For example, on the Stardust mission, the Dust Flux Monitor Instrument (DFMI) used PVDF detectors to study dust in the coma of Comet Wild 2. However, in low-dust environments such as interplanetary space, this sensitivity makes the detectors susceptible to noise. Because of this, the PVDF detectors on the Venetia Burney Student Dust Counter also needed shielded reference detectors in order to determine the background noise rate.

== Modern microphone detectors ==
During its flyby of Halley's Comet at a distance of 600 km, the Giotto spacecraft was protected from space dust by a 1 mm-thick front Whipple shield (1.85 m diameter) and a 12 mm-thick rear Kevlar shield. Mounted on the front dust shield were three piezoelectric momentum sensors of the Dust Impact Detection System (DIDSY). A fourth momentum sensor was mounted on the rear shield. These microphone detectors, together with other detectors, measured the dust distribution within the inner coma of the comet. These instruments also measured dust during Giotto's encounter with the comet 26P/Grigg–Skjellerup.

On the Mercury Magnetospheric Orbiter of the BepiColombo mission, the Mercury Dust Monitor (MDM) will measure the dust environments of interplanetary space and Mercury. MDM is composed of four piezoelectric ceramic sensors made of lead zirconate titanate, from which impact signals will be recorded and analyzed.

== Chance dust detectors ==
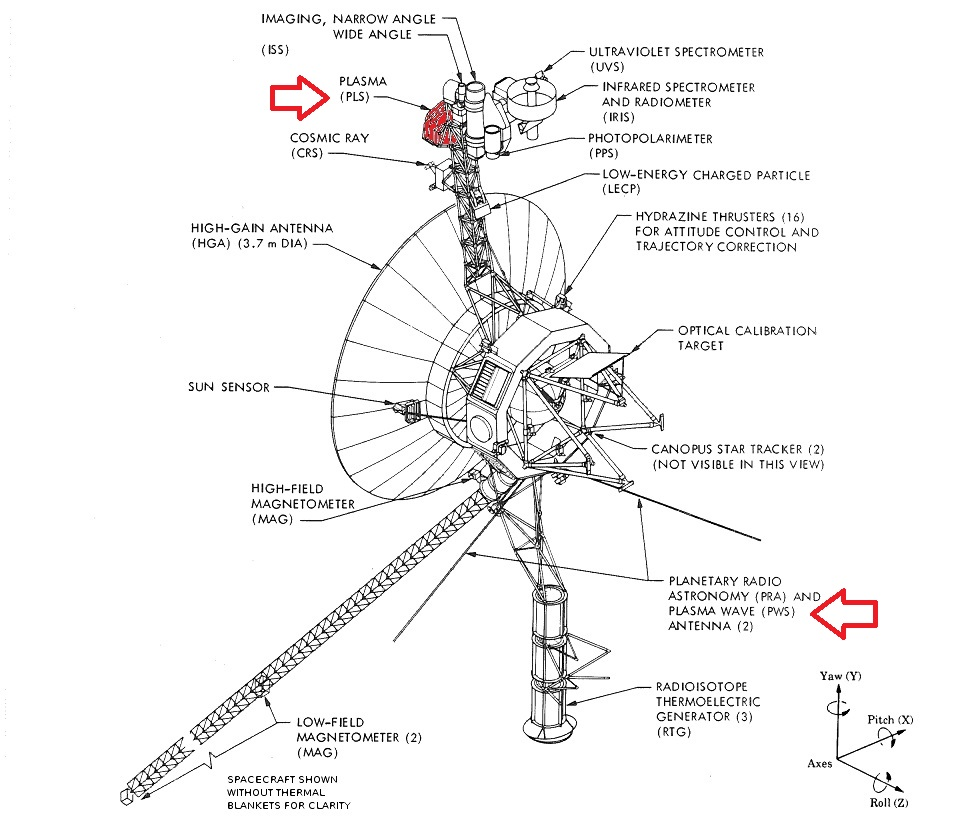
Plasma Wave instrument, PWS (lower red arrow). Note that the antennas are truncated in this diagram and are much longer than shown, extending out 10 meters.

Most instruments on a spacecraft flying through a dense dust environment will experience effects of dust impacts. A prominent example of such an instrument was the Plasma Wave Subsystem (PWS) on the Voyager 1 and Voyager 2 spacecraft. PWS provided useful information on the local dust environment. Initially, the Asteroid Meteoroid Detector (AMD) previously flown on Pioneer 10 and 11 was preliminarily selected for the Voyager payload. However, because there were doubts about its performance, the instrument was deselected and, hence, no dedicated dust instrument was carried by either Voyager 1 or 2.

During the Voyager 2 flythrough of the Saturn system, PWS detected intense impulse noise centered on the ring plane at 2.88 Saturn radii distance, slightly outside of the G ring. This noise was attributed to micron sized particles hitting the spacecraft. In-situ dust detections by the Cassini Cosmic Dust Analyzer and camera observations of the outer rings confirmed the existence of an extended G ring. Also during Voyager's flybys of Uranus and Neptune, dust concentrations in the equatorial planes were observed.

During the flyby of comet 21P/Giacobini–Zinner by the International Cometary Explorer, dust impacts were observed by the plasma wave instrument.

Though plasma wave instruments on various spacecraft claimed to detect dust, it was only in 2021 that a model for the generation of signals on plasma wave antennas by dust impacts was presented, based on dust accelerator tests.

== Impact ionization detectors ==
Impact ionization detectors are the most successful dust detectors in space. With these detectors, the interplanetary dust environment between Venus and Jupiter has been explored.

Impact ionization detectors use the simultaneous detection of positive ions and electrons upon dust impact on a solid target. This coincidence provides a means to discriminate from noise on a single channel. The first successful dust detector in interplanetary space at about 1 AU was flown on the Pioneer 8 and Pioneer 9 space probes. The Pioneer 8 and 9 detectors had sensitive target areas of 0.01 m^{2}. Besides interplanetary dust on eccentric orbits, it detected dust on hyperbolic orbits—that is, dust leaving the Solar System. The HEOS 2 dust detector was the first detector that employed a hemispherical geometry, like all the subsequent detectors of the Galileo and Ulysses spacecraft, and the LDEX detectors on the LADEE mission. The hemispherical target of 0.01 m^{2} area collected electrons from the impact and the ions were collected by the central ion collector. These signals served to determine the mass and speed of the impacted meteoroid. The HEOS 2 dust detector explored the Earth dust environment within 10 Earth radii.

The twin Galileo and Ulysses dust detectors were optimized for interplanetary dust measurements in the outer Solar System. The sensitive target areas were increased ten-fold to 0.1 m^{2} in order to cope with the expected low dust fluxes. In order to provide reliable dust impact data even within the harsh Jovian environment, an electron channeltron was added in the center of the ion grid collector. This way, an impact was detected by triple coincidence of three charge signals. The 2.5-ton Galileo spacecraft was launched in 1989 and cruised for 6 years in interplanetary space between Venus' and Jupiter's orbit and measured interplanetary dust. The 370 kg Ulysses spacecraft was launched a year later and went on a direct trajectory to Jupiter, which it reached in 1992 for a swing-by maneuver that put the spacecraft on a heliocentric orbit of 80 degrees inclination. In 1995, Galileo started its 7-year path through the Jovian system with several flybys of all the Galilean moons. After its Jupiter flyby, Ulysses identified a flow of interstellar dust sweeping through the Solar System and hyper-velocity streams of nano-dust which are emitted from Jupiter and then couple to the solar magnetic field. In addition, the Galileo instrument detected ejecta clouds around the Galilean moons.

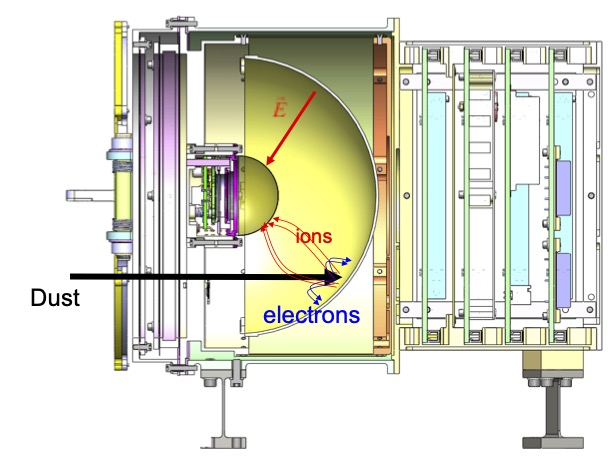
Cut-through view of the Lunar Dust Experiment (LDEX) on LADEE, for dust detection in lunar orbit

The Lunar Dust Experiment (LDEX) on board the Lunar Atmosphere and Dust Environment Explorer (LADEE) mission is a smaller version of the Galileo and Ulysses dust detectors. The most sensitive impact charge detector is a microchannel plate (MCP) behind the central focusing grid. LDEX has a sensitive area of 0.012 m^{2}. The objective of the instrument was the detection and analysis of the lunar dust environment. From 16 October 2013 to 18 April 2014, LDEX detected about 140,000 dust hits at an altitude of 20–100 km above the lunar surface. It found a tenuous and permanent, asymmetric ejecta cloud around the Moon that is caused by meteoroid impacts onto the lunar surface. From this data it was found that approximately 40 μm/Myr of lunar regolith is redistributed due to meteoritic bombardment. Besides a continuous meteoroid bombardment, meteoroid streams cause temporary enhancements of the ejecta cloud.

== Dust composition analyzers ==
The Helios Micrometeoroid Analyzer was the in-situ instrument to analyze the composition of cosmic dust. In 1974, the instrument was carried by the Helios spacecraft from the Earth's orbit down to 0.3 AU from the Sun. The goal of the Micrometeoroid Analyzer was to determine the spatial distribution of the dust in the inner planetary system, and to search for variations in the compositional and physical properties of micrometeoroids. The instrument consisted of two impact ionization time-of-flight mass spectrometers (Ecliptic and South sensor) with a total target area of about 0.01 m^{2}. One sensor was shielded by the spacecraft rim from direct sunlight, whereas the other sensor was protected by a thin aluminized parylene film from intense solar radiation. These Micrometeoroid Analyzers were calibrated with a wide range of materials at the dust accelerators of the Max Planck Institute for Nuclear Physics in Heidelberg and the Ames Research Center in Moffet Field. The mass resolution of the mass spectra of the Helios sensors was low: $R=\cfrac{M}{\Delta M} \approx 10$. There was an excess of impacts recorded by the South sensor compared to the Ecliptic sensor. On the basis of the penetration studies with the Helios film, this excess was interpreted to be due to low density ($\rho$ < 1000 kg/m^{3}) meteoroids that were shielded from entering the Ecliptic sensor. The mass spectra range from those with dominant low masses (up to 30 m_{u}), compatible with silicates, to those with dominant high masses (between 50 and 60 m_{u}), compatible with iron and molecular ions. Meteoroid streams and even interstellar dust particles were identified in the data.

Twin dust mass analyzers were flown on the 1986 Halley's Comet missions Vega 1, Vega 2, and Giotto. These spacecraft flew by the comet at a distance of 600–1,000 km with a speed of 70–80 km/s. The PUMA (Vega) and PIA (Giotto) instruments were developed by Jochen Kissel of the Max Planck Institute for Nuclear Physics in Heidelberg. Dust particle hitting the small (approximately 5 cm^{2}) impact target generated ions by impact ionization. The instruments were high mass resolution (R ≈ 100) reflectron type time-of-flight mass spectrometers. The instruments could record up to 500 impacts per second. During comet flybys, the instruments recorded an abundance of small particles of mass less than 10^{−14} grams. Besides unequilibrated silicates, many of the particles were rich in light elements such as hydrogen, carbon, nitrogen, and oxygen. This suggests that most particles consisted of a predominantly chondritic core with a refractory organic mantle.

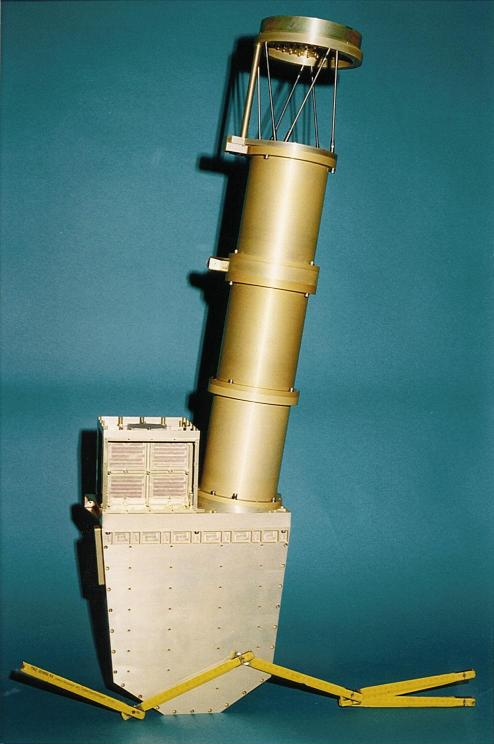
CIDA of the Stardust spacecraft. Dust particles hitting the target at the top release ions that are pulled into the drift tube and to the reflector (bottom), where their trajectories are deflected into the ion detector (left cubic box).

The Cometary and Interstellar Dust Analyzer (CIDA) was flown on the Stardust mission. In January 2004, Stardust flew by comet Comet Wild 2 at a distance of 240 km with a relative speed of 6.1 km/s. In February 2011, Stardust flew by comet Tempel 1 at a distance of 181 km with a speed of 10.9 km/s. During the interplanetary cruise between the comet encounters, there were favorable opportunities to analyze the interstellar dust stream discovered earlier by Ulysses. CIDA is a derivative of the impact ionization mass spectrometers flown on the Giotto, Vega 1, and Vega 2 missions. The impact target peeks out to the side of the spacecraft while the main part of the instrument is protected from the high-speed dust. It has a sensitive area of approximately 100 cm^{2} and a mass resolution R ≈ 250. Besides the positive ion mode, CIDA has also a negative ion mode for better sensitivity for organic molecules. The 75 spectra obtained during the comet flybys indicate a dominance of organic matter; sulfur ions were also detected in one spectrum. In the 45 spectra obtained during the cruise phase favorable for the detection of interstellar particles, derivates of quinone were suggested as constituents of the organic component.

The Cosmic Dust Analyzer (CDA) was flown on the Cassini mission to Saturn. CDA is a large-area (0.1 m^{2} total sensitive area) multi-sensor dust instrument that includes a 0.01 m^{2} medium resolution (R ≈ 20–50) chemical dust analyzer, a 0.09 m^{2} highly-reliable impact ionization detector, and two high-rate polarized polyvinylidene fluoride (PVDF) detectors with sensitive areas of 0.005 m^{2} and 0.001 m^{2}, respectively. During its 6-year cruise to Saturn, CDA analyzed interplanetary dust, the stream of interstellar dust, and Jupiter dust streams. A highlight was the detection of electrical dust charges in interplanetary space and in Saturn's magnetosphere. During the following 13 years, Cassini completed 292 orbits around Saturn (2004–2017) and measured several million dust impacts which characterize dust primarily in Saturn's E ring. In 2005, during Cassini's close flyby of Enceladus within 175 km from the surface, CDA discovered active ice geysers. Detailed compositional analyses found salt-rich water ice grains close to Enceladus, which led to the discovery of large reservoirs of liquid water oceans below the icy crust of the moon. Analyses of interstellar grains at Saturn's distance suggest magnesium-rich grains of silicate and oxide composition, some with iron inclusions.

== Dust Telescopes ==
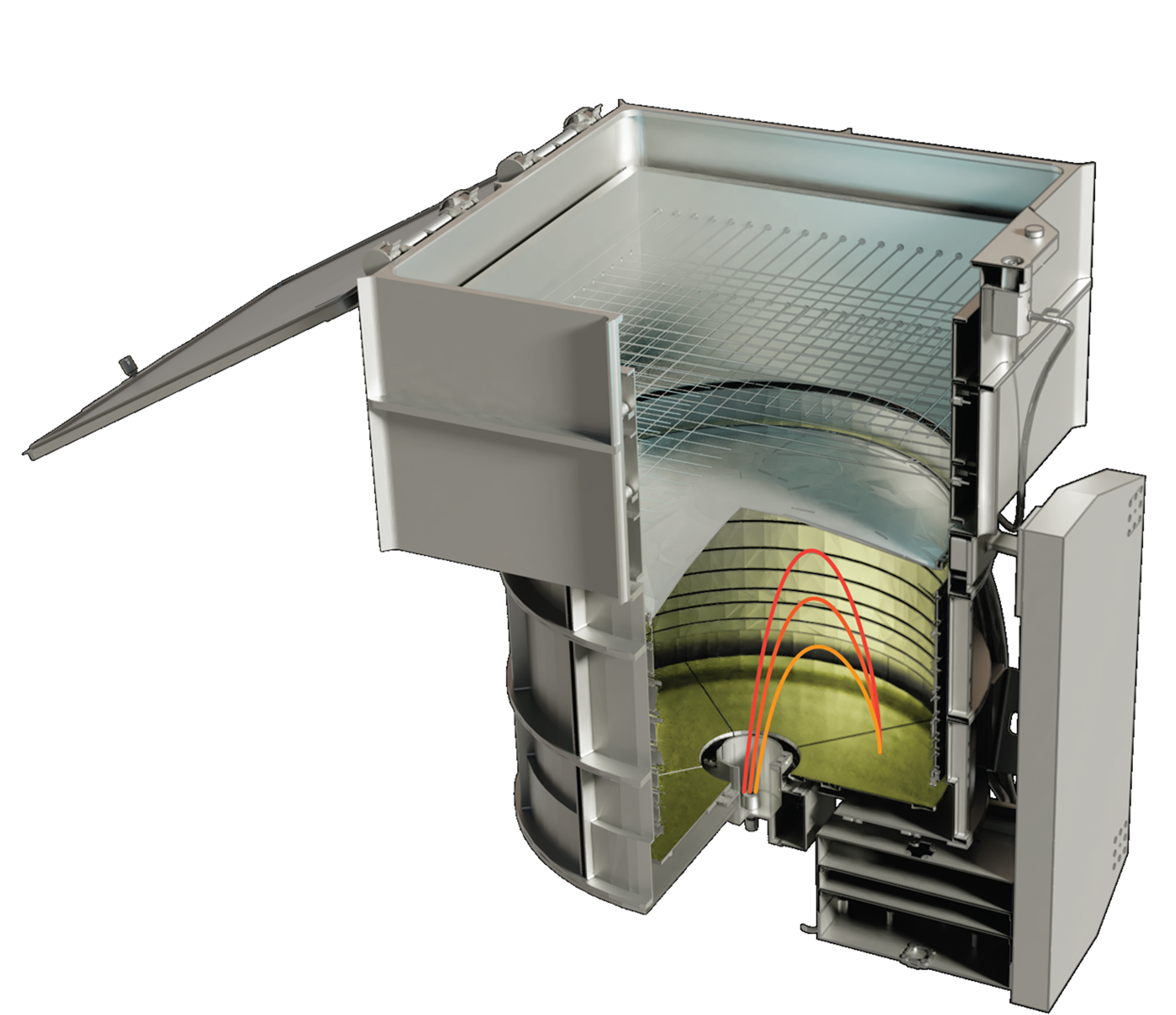
Schematic diagram of a Dust Telescope consisting of a Dust Trajectory Sensor (top part) and a Compositional Analyzer (lower part). Trajectories of ions from a dust impact onto the chemical analyzer are indicated.

A Dust Telescope is an instrument to perform dust astronomy. It not only analyses the signals and ions that are generated by a dust impact on the sensitive target, but also determines the dust trajectory prior to the impact. The latter is based on the successful measurement of the dust electric charge by Cassini's Cosmic Dust Analyzer (CDA). A Dust Trajectory Sensor consists of four planes of parallel position sensing wire electrodes. Dust accelerator tests show that dust trajectories can be determined to an accuracy of 1% in velocity and 1° in direction. The second element of a Dust Telescope is a Large-area Mass Analyzer: a reflectron type time-of-flight mass analyzer with a sensitive area of up to 0.2 m^{2} and a mass resolution R > 150. It consists of a circular plate target with the ion detector behind the center hole. In front of the target is an acceleration grid. Ions generated by an impact are reflected by a paraboloid shaped grid onto the center ion detector. Prototypes of dust telescope have been built at the Laboratory for Atmospheric and Space Physics (LASP) of the University of Colorado, Boulder, USA and at the Institute of Space Systems of the University of Stuttgart, Germany, and tested at their respective dust accelerators.

The Surface Dust Analyser (SUDA) on board the Europa Clipper mission is being developed by Sacha Kempf and colleagues at LASP. SUDA will collect spatially resolved compositional maps of Jupiter's moon Europa along the ground tracks of the Europa orbiter, and search for plumes. The instrument is capable of identifying traces of organic and inorganic compounds in the ice ejecta. The launch of the Europa Clipper mission is planned for 2024.

The DESTINY^{+} Dust Analyzer (DDA) will fly on the Japanese–German space mission DESTINY^{+} to asteroid 3200 Phaethon. Phaethon is believed to be the origin of the Geminids meteor stream that can be observed from the ground every December. DDA development is led by Ralf Srama and colleagues from the Institute of Space Systems (IRS) at the University of Stuttgart in cooperation with von Hoerner & Sulger GmbH (vH&S) company. DDA will analyze interstellar and interplanetary dust on cruise to Phaethon and will study its dust environment during the encounter; of particular interest is the proportion of organic matter. Its launch is planned for 2024.

The Interstellar Dust Experiment (IDEX), developed by Mihaly Horanyi and colleagues at LASP, will fly on the Interstellar Mapping and Acceleration Probe (IMAP) in orbit about the Sun–Earth L1 Lagrange point. IDEX is a large-area (0.07 m^{2}) dust analyzer that provides the mass distribution and elemental composition of interstellar and interplanetary dust particles. A laboratory version of the IDEX instrument was used at the dust accelerator facility operated at University of Colorado to collect impact ionization mass spectra for a range of dust samples of known composition. Its launch is planned for 2025.

== Collected dust analyses ==
The importance of lunar samples and lunar soil for dust science was that they provided a meteoroid impact cratering record. Even more important are the cosmochemical aspects—from their isotopic, elemental, molecular, and mineralogical compositions, important conclusions can be drawn, such as concerning the giant-impact hypothesis of the Moon's formation. From 1969 to 1972, six Apollo missions collected 382 kilograms of lunar rocks and soil. These samples are available for research and teaching projects. From 1970 to 1976, three Luna spacecraft returned 301 grams of lunar material. In 2020, Chang'e 5 collected 1.7 kg of lunar material.

In 1950, Fred Whipple showed that micrometeoroids smaller than a critical size (~100 micrometers) are decelerated at altitudes above 100 km slowly enough to radiate their frictional energy away without melting. Such micrometeorites sediment through the atmosphere and ultimately deposit on the ground. The most efficient method to collect micrometeorites is by high (~20 km) flying aircraft with special silicon oil covered collectors that capture this dust. At lower altitudes, these micrometeorites become mixed with Earth dust. Don Brownlee first reliably identified the extraterrestrial nature of collected dust particles by their chondritic composition. These stratospheric dust samples are available for further research.

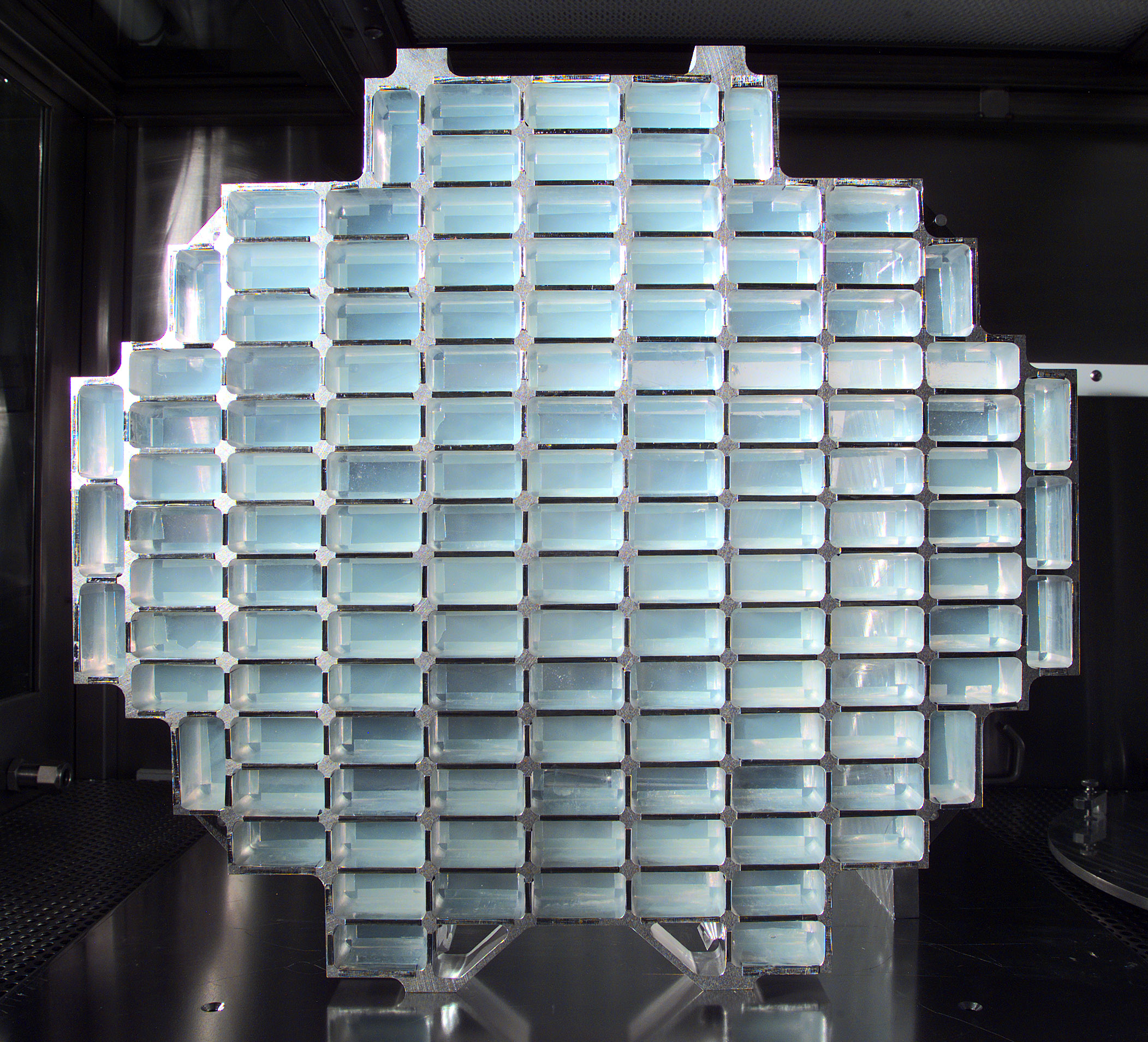
Stardust aerogel dust collector

Stardust was the first mission to return samples from a comet and from interstellar space. In January 2004, Stardust flew by Comet Wild 2 at a distance of 237 km with a relative velocity of 6.1 km/s. Its dust collector consisted of 0.104 m^{2} aerogel and 0.015 m^{2} aluminium foil; one side of the detector was exposed to the flow of cometary dust. The Stardust cometary samples were a mix of different components, including presolar grains like ^{13}C-rich silicon carbide grains, a wide range of chondrule-like fragments, and high-temperature condensates like calcium-aluminum inclusions found in primitive meteorites that were transported to cold nebular regions. During March–May 2000 and July–December 2002, the spacecraft was in a favorable position to collect interstellar dust on the back side of the sample collector. Once the sample capsule was returned in January 2006, the collector trays were inspected and thousands of grains from Comet Wild 2 and seven probable interstellar grains were identified. These grains are available for teaching and research from the NASA Astromaterials Curation Office.

The first asteroid samples were returned by the JAXA Hayabusa missions. Hayabusa encountered asteroid 25143 Itokawa in November 2005, picked up surface samples, and returned to Earth in June 2010. Despite some problems during sample collection, thousands of 10–100 micron sized particles were collected and are available for research in the laboratories. The second Hayabusa2 mission rendezvoused with asteroid 162173 Ryugu in June 2018. About 5 g of surface and sub-surface material from this primitive C-type asteroid were returned. JAXA shares about 10% of the collected samples with NASA sample curation.

The Rosetta space probe orbited comet 67P/Churyumov–Gerasimenko from August 2014 to September 2016. During this time, Rosetta's instruments analyzed the nucleus, dust, gas, and plasma environments. Rosetta carried a suite of miniaturized sophisticated lab instruments to study collected cometary dust particles. Among them was the high-resolution secondary ion mass spectrometer COSIMA (Cometary Secondary Ion Mass Analyzer) that analyzed the rocky and organic composition of collected dust particles, an atomic force microscope MIDAS (Micro-Imaging Dust Analysis System) that investigated morphology and physical properties of micrometer-sized dust particles that were deposited on a collector plate, and the double-focus magnetic mass spectrometer (DFMS) and the reflectron type time of flight mass spectrometer (RTOF) of ROSINA (Rosetta Orbiter Spectrometer for Ion and Neutral Analysis) to analyze cometary gas and the volatile components of cometary particulates. Rosetta's Philae lander carried the gas chromatography–mass spectrometry COSAC experiment to analyze organic molecules in the comet's atmosphere and on its surface.

== See also ==
- Cosmic Dust Analyzer
- Galileo and Ulysses Dust Detectors
- Helios Dust Instrumentation
- Surface Dust Analyser
- Venetia Burney Student Dust Counter
- Micro-Imaging Dust Analysis System
