= Cosmic Dust Analyzer =

Scientific instrument on Cassini spacecraft

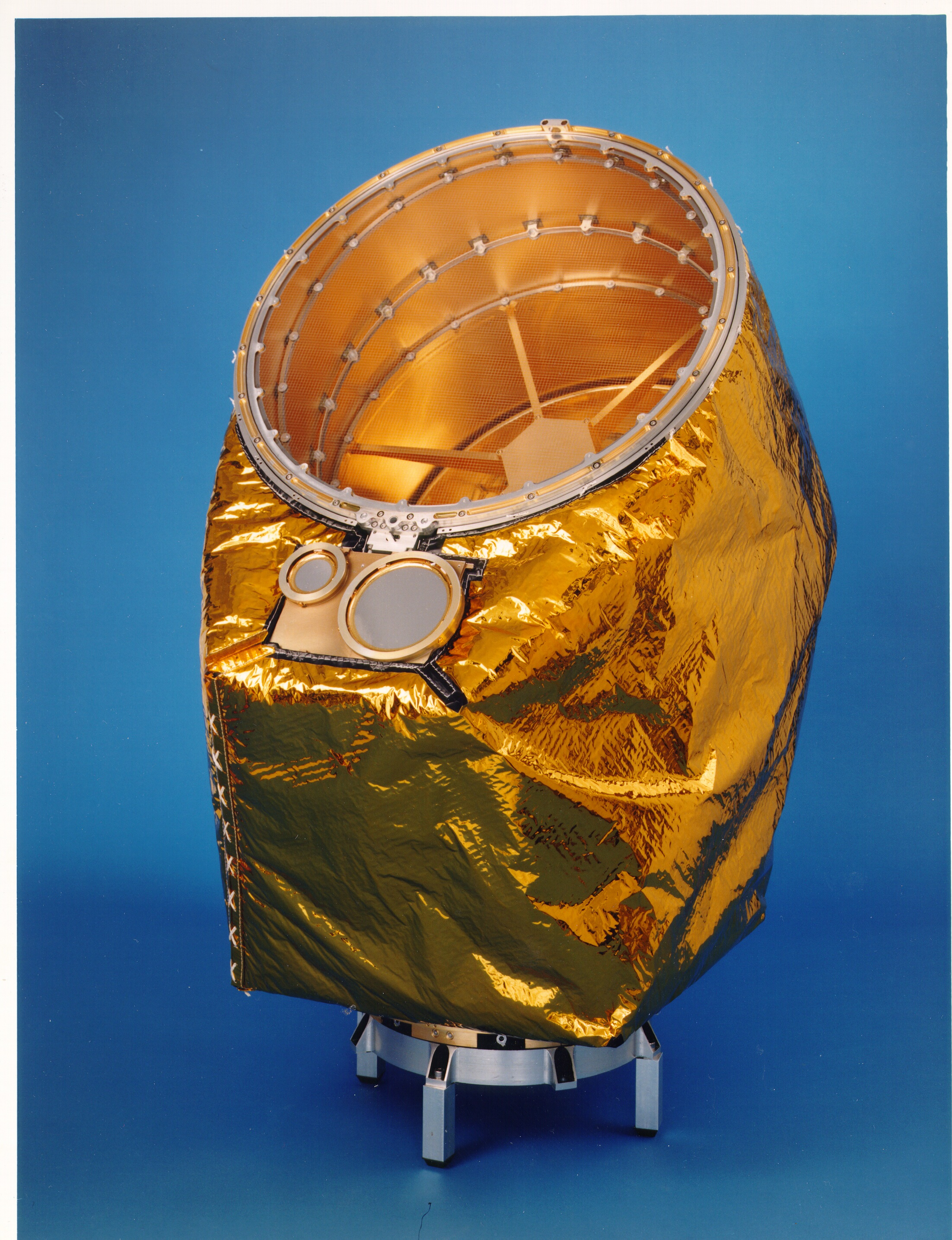
Cassini Cosmic Dust Detector, CDA

The Cosmic Dust Analyzer (CDA) was a large-area (0.1 m^{2} total sensitive area) multi-sensor dust instrument included on the Cassini spacecraft, which was launched in 1997 and orbited Saturn from 2004 to 2017. The instrument included a chemical dust analyzer (time-of-flight mass spectrometer), a highly reliable impact ionization detector, and two high rate polarized polyvinylidene fluoride (PVDF) detectors. Over 7 years en route to Saturn, the CDA analysed the interplanetary dust cloud, the stream of interstellar dust, and Jupiter dust streams. During 13 years in orbit around Saturn, the CDA studied the E ring, dust in the plumes of Enceladus, and dust in Saturn's environment.

== Overview ==
Dust impacts on the Compositional Analyzer Target (CAT) of CDA and generated signals.

The Cosmic Dust Analyzer was the seventh dust instrument from the Max Planck Institute for Nuclear Physics (MPIK), Heidelberg (Germany) following the dust detectors on the HEOS 2 satellite and dust detectors on the Galileo and Ulysses space probes and the more complex dust analyzers on the Helios spacecraft, the Giotto and VeGa spacecraft to Halley's Comet. The new dust analyzer system was developed by a team of scientists led by Eberhard Grün and engineers led by Dietmar Linkert to analyze dust in the Saturn system on board the Cassini spacecraft. This instrument employed a larger sensitive area (0.1 m^{2}) impact detector, a smaller time-of-flight mass spectrometer chemical analyzer and two high rate polarized polyvinylidene fluoride (PVDF) detectors, in order to cope with the high fluxes during crossings of the E ring. The Max Planck Institute for Nuclear Physics in Heidelberg was responsible for the overall instrument development and test. Major contributions were provided by the DLR in Berlin-Adlershof (mechanics, cleanliness, thermal design, tests), Tony McDonnell from University of Canterbury (chemical analyzer, UK), Rutherford Appleton Laboratory (spectrometer electronics, UK) and G. Pahl (mechanical design, Munich, Ger). The PVDF detectors were provided by Tony Tuzzolino from the University of Chicago. The proposing Principal Investigator for CDA was Eberhard Grün. In 1990 the PI-ship was handed over to Ralf Srama from the Max Planck Institute for Nuclear Physics, who is now at the University of Stuttgart, Germany. Ralf Srama got his degree “Dr.-Ing.” from the Technical University of Munich for his Thesis (10 Nov. 2000, in German), "From the Cosmic-Dust-Analyzer to a model describing scientific spacecraft".

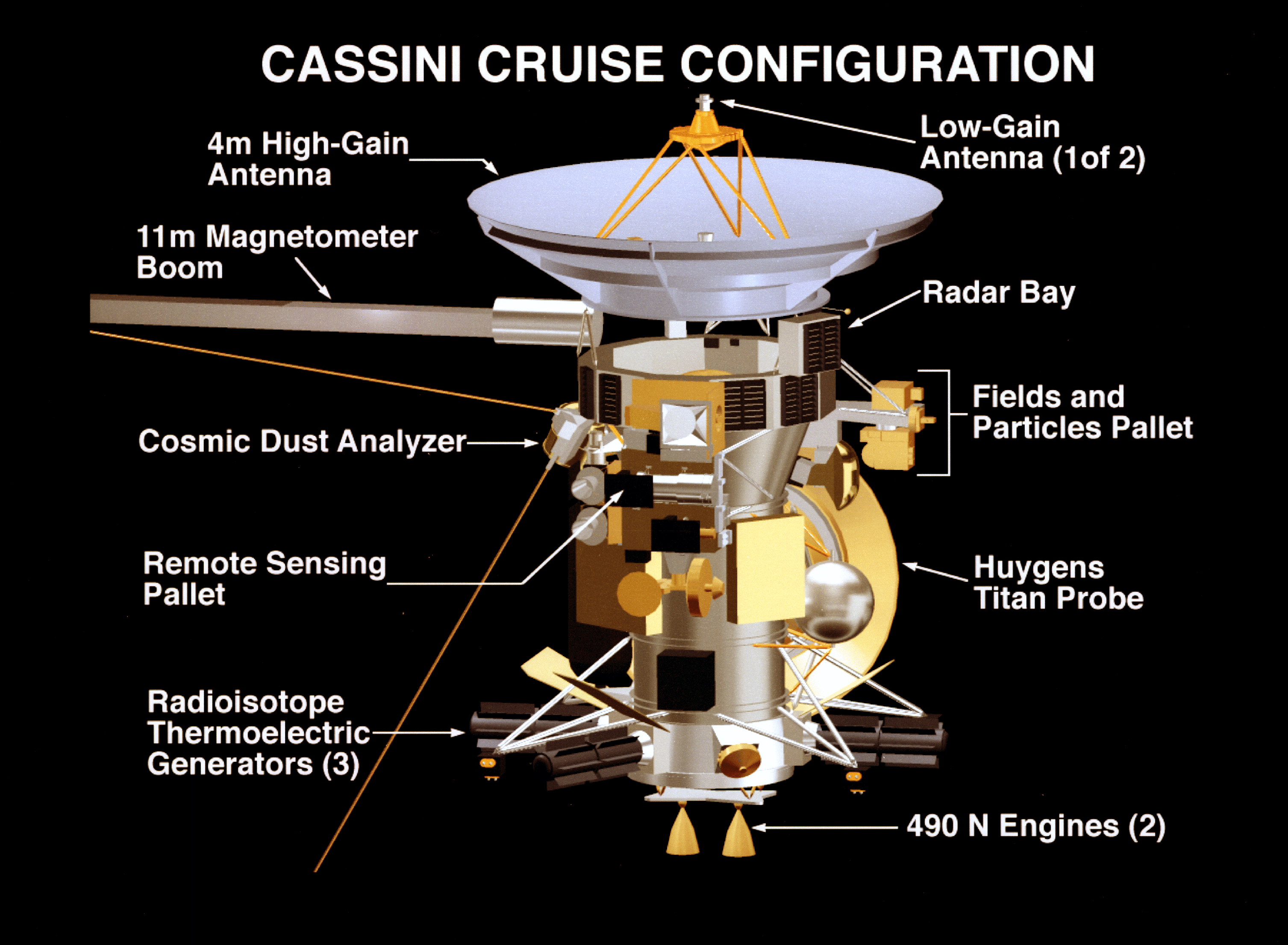
Cassini spacecraft with instruments

The main sensor of CDA was an impact ionization detector (IID), similar to the Galileo and Ulysses Dust Detectors. The center of the hemispherical target had the smaller (0.016 m^{2}) Chemical Analyzer Target, CAT, at +1000 V electric potential. Three millimeters in front of the target was a grid at 0 V potential. Dust impacts onto CAT generated a plasma that was separated by the high electric field. Ions obtained an energy of ~1000eV and were focused towards the center collector. Ions were partly collected by the semi-transparent grid at 230 millimeter distance and the center electron multiplier. The waveforms of the charge signals were measured, stored and transmitted to ground. The multiplier signal represented a time-of-flight mass spectrum of the released ions. Two of the four grids at the entrance of the analyzer picked up the electric charge of the dust particle. With these capabilities, the CDA can be considered a prototype dust telescope.

CDA measured the micrometeoroid environment for 18 years, from 1999 until the last active seconds of Cassini in 2017 without major degradation. The instrument fly-away-cover was released in 1997 on day 317. Science planning and operations were managed by Max-Planck-Institute for Nuclear Physics and later by the University of Stuttgart.

The Cassini spacecraft was a three-axes stabilized spacecraft with the antenna occasionally pointing to Earth in order to download data and receive operational commands. In the mean time Cassini’s attitude was controlled by requested observations from one or more of the 12 instruments onboard. In order to obtain some more control of its pointing attitude, CDA employed a turntable between the spacecraft and the dust analyzer.

== Major discoveries and observations ==
=== During interplanetary cruise ===
From launch in 1997 until arrival at Saturn in 2004, Cassini–Huygens cruised interplanetary space from 0.7 to 10 AU. During this time there were long periods useful for observations of interplanetary and interstellar dust in the inner planetary system. Highlights were the detection of electrical charges of dust in interplanetary space and the determination of the composition of interplanetary dust particles. No measurements were possible during the crossing of the asteroid belt. During Jupiter flyby in 2000 there was a chance to analyze nanometer-sized dust stream particles and demonstrate their compositional relation to Jupiter's moon Io where they originate from. On approach to Saturn in 2004, similar streams of submicron grains with speeds in the order of 100 km/s were detected. These particles originate mostly from the outer parts of the dense rings. They were ejected by Saturn’s magnetic field until they become entrained in the solar wind magnetic field. The Saturn stream particles consist of silicate impurities of the primary icy ring particles.

=== In Saturn orbit ===
During Cassini’s 292 orbits around Saturn (2004 to 2017) CDA measured several million dust impacts that characterize dust mostly in Saturn’s E ring. In this process CDA found that the E ring extends about twice as far from Saturn as optically observed. Measurements of variable dust charges depending on the magnetospheric plasma conditions (allowed the definition of a dynamical dust model of Saturn's E ring describing the observed properties. In 2005 during Cassini’s close flyby of Enceladus within 175 km from the surface CDA together with two other Cassini instruments discovered active ice geysers located at the south pole of Saturn's moon Enceladus. Later, detailed compositional analyses of the water ice grains in the vicinity of Enceladus led to the discovery of large reservoirs of liquid water oceans below the icy crust of Enceladus. During the Cassini spacecraft’s Grand Finale mission in 2017, it performed 22 traversals of the region between Saturn and its innermost D ring. During this path CDA detected of dust from Saturn's dense rings. Most analyzed grains were a few tens of nanometers in size and had silicate and water-ice composition. For most of Cassini’s orbital tour CDA observed a faint signature of interstellar dust in the largely dominant foreground of E ring water-ice particles. Mass spectra of the interstellar grains suggest the presence of magnesium-rich grains of silicate and oxide composition, some with iron inclusions. Major discoveries until 2011 were summarized in a dedicated paper.

== See also ==
- Galileo and Ulysses Dust Detectors
