= Eberhard Grün =

German astronomer (born 1942)

Eberhard Grün (born 30 March 1942, in Germany) is a German planetary scientist who specialized in cosmic dust research. He is an active emeritus at the Max Planck Institute for Nuclear Physics (MPIK), Heidelberg (Germany), research associate at the Laboratory for Atmospheric and Space Physics (LASP) in Boulder (Colorado), and was a professor at the University of Heidelberg until his retirement in 2007. Eberhard Grün has had a leading role in international cosmic dust science for over 40 years.

== Education ==
Eberhard Grün studied physics at the University of Heidelberg and received his degree in 1968. After his studies he did his PhD in the Max Planck Institute for Nuclear Physics in Heidelberg, and he received his doctoral degree in 1970 from the University of Heidelberg. The topic of his thesis was "Mass Spectroscopy of Impact Induced Ions". From 1970 until 1974, he was a research assistant in the MPIK, developing dust detectors for spaceborne missions and doing research on impact ionization for these dust detectors. During this period, he spent six months as a visiting scientist at NASA Goddard Space Flight Center focusing on data analysis of cosmic dust experiments, and six months as a visiting scientist at the NASA Ames Research Center, doing research on hypervelocity impact phenomena. In 1974, he became a senior research scientist at the MPIK.

Eberhard Grün habilitated in physics in 1981 at the University of Heidelberg and he became a lecturer ("Privat-Dozent") at this same University in 1983. In 1981 he went back to the US for six months as a senior research associate of the US National Research Council (NRC), while working at the Jet Propulsion Laboratory. There he concentrated on dust-magnetosphere interactions and on data analysis of the Voyager 2 spacecraft. This stay abroad was followed in 1982 by a six months stay at the Lunar and Planetary science Institute (LPI) in Houston, for studying dynamics of interplanetary dust.

Since 1989, he is apl. professor at the University of Heidelberg.

In 2000, he became researcher at the Hawaii institute of Geophysics and Planetology, at the University of Hawaii, Honolulu (until 2007), while remaining a senior research scientist at the MPIK.

In 2004, Eberhard Grün was a visiting scientist ("Erskine Visitor") at the Physics and Astronomy department of the University of Canterbury, Christchurch, New Zealand where he gave several lectures on the Solar System, orbital dynamics, and the cosmos.

In 2007, he became a research associate at the Laboratory for Atmospheric and Space Physics (LASP) of the University of Colorado in Boulder (USA).

In 2007, he retired from the MPIK after having worked there for 37 years. He remains active in dust science as an emeritus at the MPIK, and as a research associate at LASP.

== Scientific work ==
His research focuses on cosmic dust research (planetary, interplanetary, and interstellar dust), lunar dust processes, development of space instrumentation (Helios, Giotto, Galileo, Ulysses, Cassini–Huygens), and dust accelerator research. During his scientific career the main fields of his work were:

- Dust accelerator experiments to study impact processes and calibrating space instruments, cf. chapter "Laboratory Simulation" by H. Fechtig, E. Grün, and J. Kissel in
- Development of in situ space instrumentation for dynamical and chemical analysis of interplanetary and interstellar dust grains
- In situ investigation of planetary, interplanetary and interstellar dust
- Editor of the book "Interplanetary Dust"
- Modeling of interplanetary dust
- Astronomical and in situ investigation of comets and cometary dust
- Dynamics and chemistry of meteoroids
- Dynamics of planetary dust
- Development of models of interplanetary dust
- Development of the Dust astronomy concept

From 1981 until his retirement in 2007, he guided over 100 undergraduate and 50 graduate students towards their PhD-degrees. He wrote more than fifty first-author papers and collaborated with other scientists on more than 300 papers. More than ten of his publication were issued in the worldwide leading journals Nature or Science. His research has an unmatched impact on dust science in the Solar System.

Eberhard Grün was the Principal Investigator (PI) of dust instruments on many space missions such as the Helios (1974), Galileo (1989), Ulysses (1990), and Cassini–Huygens (1997). Moreover, he was a PI and Co-Investigator (Co-I) for numerous other observations and instruments. Among the most prominent are the dust instruments on board the Mars mission Nozomi (1998), ESA's first cometary mission Giotto (1985), and the IR photometer on the Infrared Space Observatory ISO (1995). In 1987 when he was member of the Science Team for the next joint ESA and NASA comet mission he suggested the name "Rosetta" for that mission. Later he was selected Interdisciplinary Scientist for ESA's Rosetta mission to comet Churyumov–Gerasimenko and he was Co-I for several Instruments on the spacecraft.

=== Main discoveries ===
His work on detection techniques of dust in the Solar System has led to a thorough understanding of the distribution of dust in the Solar System. His scientific work is most known on the size distribution of interplanetary dust at 1 AU, which is a reference for many studies and known as the Grün distribution. Moreover, his dust detector on board the Ulysses space craft discovered the flow of interstellar dust sweeping through the Solar System and the hyper-velocity streams of nano-dust which are emitted from Jupiter and then couple to the solar magnetic field.

Together with his co-workers he made further important contributions:

- Prediction and detection of ISD focusing and defocusing cycles
- Detection of dust streams from Jupiter, and how they are fed from the Jovian satellite Io
- Detection of ejecta clounds around the Galilean moons
- Propagation and evolution of dust emitted from comets
- Detection of "beta meteoroids“ on hyperbolic trajectories
- Leading developer of impact ionization dust detectors in space
- Study of cometary processes in space and in the laboratory

== Memberships ==
Eberhard Grün is affiliated to the following professional societies:

- Deutsche Physikalische Gesellschaft (DPG, member of the executive board of subcommittee AEF, 1988–1993)
- Astronomische Gesellschaft AG
- American Geophysical Union AGU
- American Astronomical Society AAS
- Committee on Space Research COSPAR (interdisciplinary scientific commission B, secretary 1986-1990 and B.1 (chairman 1980-1984)
- International Astronomical Union IAU

== Honors ==
In 2022 Eberhard Grün earned an Honorary degree Dr.-Ing. (h.c.) from University of Stuttgart, Germany.

Eberhard Grün has received numerous prizes in recognition of his scientific work. Since 1976, he received several NASA and ESA awards. He was elected as a fellow of the American Geophysical Union, and as foreign associate of the Royal Astronomical Society.

In 1996 the asteroid 1981 EY20 was named after him, "4240 Grün".

Eberhard Grün was the recipient of the Gerard P. Kuiper Prize of the Division for Planetary Sciences (DPS) of the American Astronomical Society (AAS) in 2002, for "outstanding contributions to the field of planetary science". The DPS mentions: "His career is an unbroken record of high quality work that has provided us with a good fraction of what we understand about the smallest bodies in the solar system".

In 2003 he received the David Robert Bates Medal from the European Geosciences Union (EGU) for his "Innovative experimental and wideranging scientific contributions to dust research throughout the heliosphere".

In 2006 he received the Space Science award of the COSPAR for outstanding contributions to space science.

Eberhard Grün received the Gold Medal of the Royal Astronomical Society in April 2011 for his leading role in dust science for over 30 years. This is one of the highest awards for astronomers and planetary scientists.

== Selected media appearances ==
On May 5, 2011, Eberhard Grün was guest in the German science talk show Scobel hosted by Gert Scobel.

== See also ==
- Cosmic Dust Analyzer
- Galileo and Ulysses Dust Detectors
