= 6170 Levasseur =

Mars-crossing asteroid

Discovery
- Discovered by: E. Bowell
- Discovery site: Anderson Mesa Stn.
- Discovery date: 5 April 1981

Designations
- Named after: Anny-Chantal Levasseur-Regourd (French planetary scientist)
- Alternative designations: 1981 GP · 1983 TL_{2} 1988 FA
- Minor planet category: Mars-crosser; Phocea

Orbital characteristics
- Epoch 27 April 2019 (JD 2458600.5)
- Uncertainty parameter 0
- Observation arc: 63.93 yr (23,349 d)
- Aphelion: 3.1029 AU
- Perihelion: 1.5996 AU
- Semi-major axis: 2.3512 AU
- Eccentricity: 0.3197
- Orbital period (sidereal): 3.61 yr (1,317 d)
- Mean anomaly: 240.28°
- Mean motion: 0° 16^{m} 24.24^{s} / day
- Inclination: 22.580°
- Longitude of ascending node: 11.773°
- Argument of perihelion: 103.77°
- Earth MOID: 0.755 AU (294 LD)

Physical characteristics
- Mean diameter: 5.68±0.57 km
- Synodic rotation period: 2.6529±0.0003 h (Note: Lightcurve plots of (6170) Levasseur: Dec 2005 by Pray and Pravec, May 2010, David Higgins, Kusnirak, Pravec, and Feb 2017, Sugerloaf Mountain, Higgins and Pravec, from Ondrejov data obtained by the NEO Photometric Program and collaborating projects. Summary figures for (6170) Levasseur at the LCDB.)
- Geometric albedo: 0.239
- Spectral type: S
- Absolute magnitude (H): 13.00; 13.40

6170 Levasseur, provisional designation 1981 GP, is a stony Phocaean asteroid and sizable Mars-crosser on an eccentric orbit from the inner regions of the asteroid belt, approximately 5.7 kilometers (3.5 miles) in diameter. It was discovered on 5 April 1981, by American astronomer Edward Bowell at the Anderson Mesa Station in Arizona. The S-type asteroid has a short rotation period of 2.65 hours. It was named for French planetary scientist Anny-Chantal Levasseur-Regourd.

== Orbit and classification ==
Levasseur is a member of the Mars-crossing asteroids, a dynamically unstable group between the main belt and the near-Earth populations, crossing the orbit of Mars at 1.66 AU. The asteroid has also been identified as a member of the Phocaea family (701) – an old, stony main-belt family with nearly 2000 known members – when applying the HCM algorithms to its proper orbital elements.

It orbits the Sun in the inner asteroid belt at a distance of 1.6–3.1 AU once every 3 years and 7 months (1,317 days; semi-major axis of 2.35 AU). Its orbit has a very eccentricity of 0.32 and an inclination of 23° with respect to the ecliptic. The body's observation arc begins with a precovery taken at Palomar Observatory in September 1954, more than 26 years prior to its official discovery observation at Lowell Observatory's Anderson Mesa Station in April 1981.

== Naming ==
This minor planet was named after Anny-Chantal Levasseur-Regourd (born 1945), a French planetary scientist and former astronaut candidate. She has been professor at UPMC in Paris and works at the French National Center for Scientific Research, CNRS. Her research includes comets, the interplanetary medium and interplanetary dust. She has also been a principal investigator when the Giotto spacecraft visited Comet Halley in 1986. The official naming citation was published by the Minor Planet Center on 1 July 1996 (M.P.C. 27461).

== Physical characteristics ==
Levasseur is a common, stony S-type asteroid, in line with the Phocaea family's overall spectral type.

=== Rotation period ===
In December 2005, a rotational lightcurve of Levasseur was obtained from photometric observations by Donald Pray at the Carbuncle Hill Observatory (912) in collaboration with other European and American observers. Lightcurve analysis gave a rotation period of 2.6529±0.0003 hours with a brightness variation of 0.14±0.02 magnitude (U=3).

In April 2010, two nearly identical periods were found by David Higgins at the Hunters Hill Observatory (E14) in Australia and by Petr Pravec and collaborators at the Ondřejov Observatory in the Czech Republic. Their analysis gave a period of 2.6528±0.0004 and 2.6531±0.0002 hours with an amplitude of 0.13 and 0.09, respectively (U=2/3). (Note: Pravec (April 2010) web: rotation period 2.6531±0.0002 hours with an amplitude of 0.09±0.01 mag. Quality Code is 3. Summary figures at the LCDB and Pravec, P.; Wolf, M.; Sarounova, L. (2010).) While not being a fast rotator, Levasseur's rotation is near the cohesionless spin-barrier of 2.2 hours.

=== Diameter and albedo ===
According to a dedicated survey of Mars-crossing asteroids carried out by the NEOWISE mission of NASA's Wide-field Infrared Survey Explorer, Levasseur measures 5.68 kilometers in diameter and its surface has an albedo of 0.239. The Collaborative Asteroid Lightcurve Link assumes a standard for a stony asteroid of 0.20 and calculates a diameter of 6.21 kilometers based on an absolute magnitude of 13.4.

==== Sizable Mars-crosser ====
With a diameter of 5.68 kilometers, Levasseur is still one of the smaller "sizable" Mars-crossers (5–15 km). These include 3581 Alvarez (13.69 km) 1065 Amundsenia (9.75 km), 1139 Atami (9.35 km), 3737 Beckman (14.36 km), 1474 Beira (15.46 km), 5682 Beresford (7.33 km), 1011 Laodamia (7.39 km), 1727 Mette (5.44 km), 1131 Porzia (7.13 km), 1235 Schorria (5.55 km), 985 Rosina (8.18 km), 1310 Villigera (15.24 km), and 1468 Zomba (7 km), which are smaller than the largest members of this dynamical group, namely, 132 Aethra, 323 Brucia (former Mars-crosser), 1508 Kemi, 2204 Lyyli and 512 Taurinensis, all larger than 20 kilometers.
