= Galileo and Ulysses Dust Detectors =

Dust instruments on the Galileo and Ulysses missions

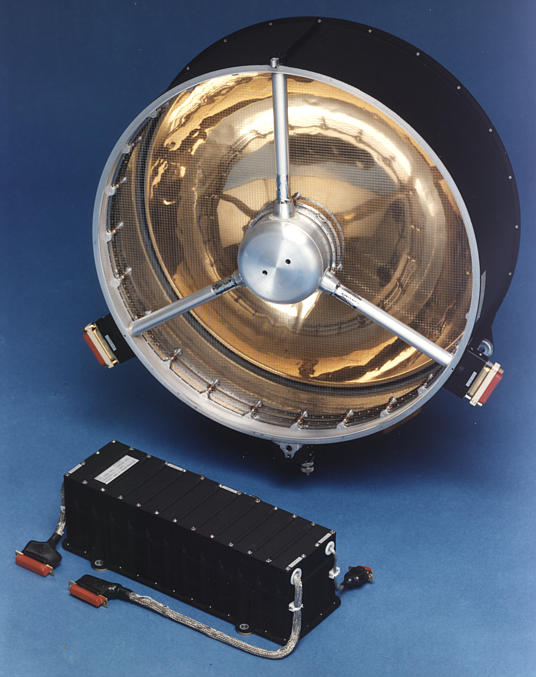
Galileo dust detector with electronics box

The Galileo and Ulysses Dust Detectors are almost identical dust instruments on the Galileo and Ulysses missions. The instruments are large-area (0.1 m^{2} sensitive area) highly reliable impact ionization detectors of sub-micron and micron sized dust particles. With these instruments the interplanetary dust cloud was characterized between Venus’ and Jupiter's orbits and over the solar poles. A stream of interstellar dust passing through the planetary system was discovered. Close to and inside the Jupiter system streams nanometer sized dust particles that were emitted from volcanoes on Jupiter's moon Io and ejecta clouds around the Galilean moons were discovered and characterized.

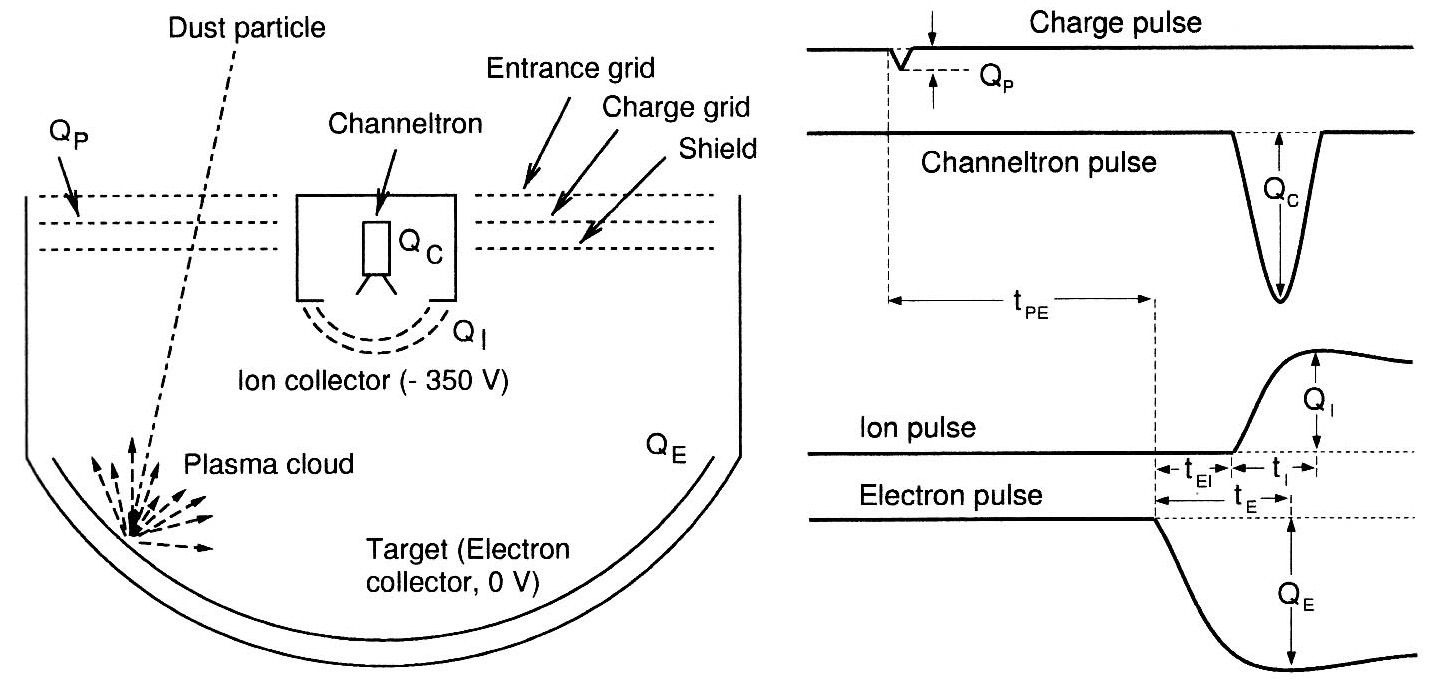
Schematics of the Galileo and Ulysses dust detectors with signals

== Overview ==
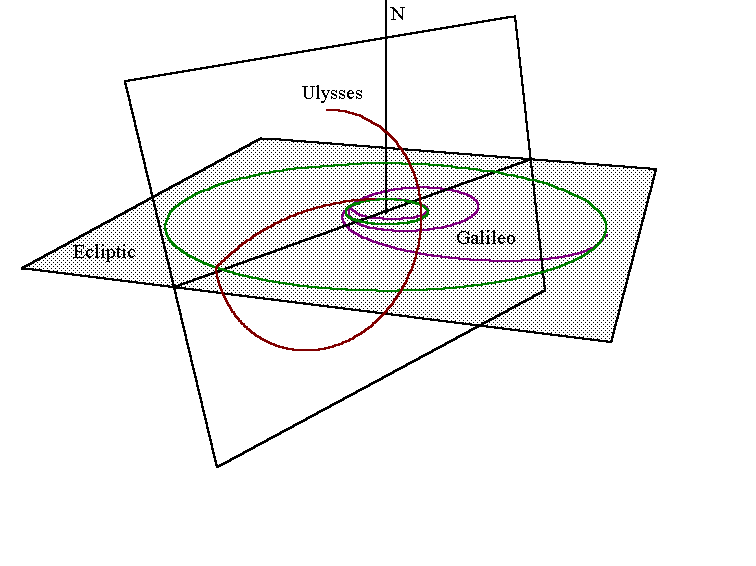
Trajectories of Galileo (blue) and Ulysses (black) from Earth (green) to Jupiter (red).

Following the first dust instruments from the Max Planck Institute for Nuclear Physics (MPIK), Heidelberg (Germany) on the HEOS 2 satellite and the Helios spacecraft a new dust instrument was developed by a Team of Scientists and Engineers of Eberhard Grün to detect cosmic dust in the outer planetary system. This instrument had 10 times larger sensitive area (0.1 m^{2}) and employed a multiple coincidence of impact signals in order to cope with the low fluxes of cosmic dust and the hostile environment in the outer planets magnetospheres.

The Galileo and Ulysses dust detectors use impact ionization from hypervelocity impacts of cosmic dust particles onto the hemispherical target. Electrons and ions from the impact plasma are separated by the electric field between the target and the center ion collector. Ions are partly collected by the semi-transparent grid and the center channeltron multiplier. The amplitudes of the impact, the rise-times, and time relations of the charge signals are measured, stored and transmitted to ground. Using this information noise from impacts events were separated and properties (mass and speed) of the impacting dust particles were determined. The center grid of the three grids at the entrance of the detector pick-up the electric charge of the dust particle. Unfortunately, no dust charges were reliably identified by these instruments during their space operation.

The Galileo Dust Detector was developed by the Team of Scientists and Engineers led by Eberhard Grün at the Max Planck Institute for Nuclear Physics (MPIK), Heidelberg (Germany) and was selected in 1977 by NASA to explore the dust environment of Jupiter on board the Galileo Jupiter Orbiter. The Galileo spacecraft was a dual-spin spacecraft with its antenna pointing to Earth. The dust detector was mounted on the spinning section at an angle of 60° with respect to the spin axis. Galileo was launched in 1989 and cruised for 6 years interplanetary space between Venus’ and Jupiter's orbits before it started in 1995 its 7-year path through the Jovian system with several fly-bys of all Galilean moons. The Galileo dust detector operated during the whole mission.

About a year after Galileo the twin instrument was selected for the out-of-ecliptic Ulysses mission. Ulysses was a spinning spacecraft with the dust detector mounted at 85° to the spin axis. Launch of Ulysses was in 1990 and the spacecraft went on a direct trajectory to Jupiter which it reached in 1992 for a swing-by maneuver which put the spacecraft on a heliocentric orbit of 80 degrees inclination. This orbit had a period of 6.2 years and a perihelion of 1.25 AU and an aphelion of 5.4 AU. Ulysses completed 2.5 orbits until the mission was ended. The Ulysses dust detector operated during the whole mission.

The initial Principal Investigator for both instruments was Eberhard Grün. In 1996 the PI-ship was handed over to Harald Krüger from Max Planck Institute for Solar System Research, Göttingen, Germany.

== Major discoveries ==
Interplanetary dust

Galileo and Ulysses traversed interplanetary space from Venus’ orbit (0.7 AU) to Jupiter’s orbit (~5 AU) and about 2 AU above and below the solar poles. During all the time the dust experiments recorded cosmic dust particles that were an important input to a model of interplanetary dust.

Interstellar dust

After Jupiter flyby Ulysses identified a flow of interstellar dust sweeping through the Solar System.

Dust in the Jupiter system

After Jupiter flyby Ulysses detected hyper-velocity streams of nano-dust which are emitted from Jupiter and then couple to the solar magnetic field.

Dust streams from Jupiter, and their interactions with the Jovian satellite Io were detected, as well as ejecta clouds around the Galilean moons.
