= Anny-Chantal Levasseur-Regourd =

French astronomer

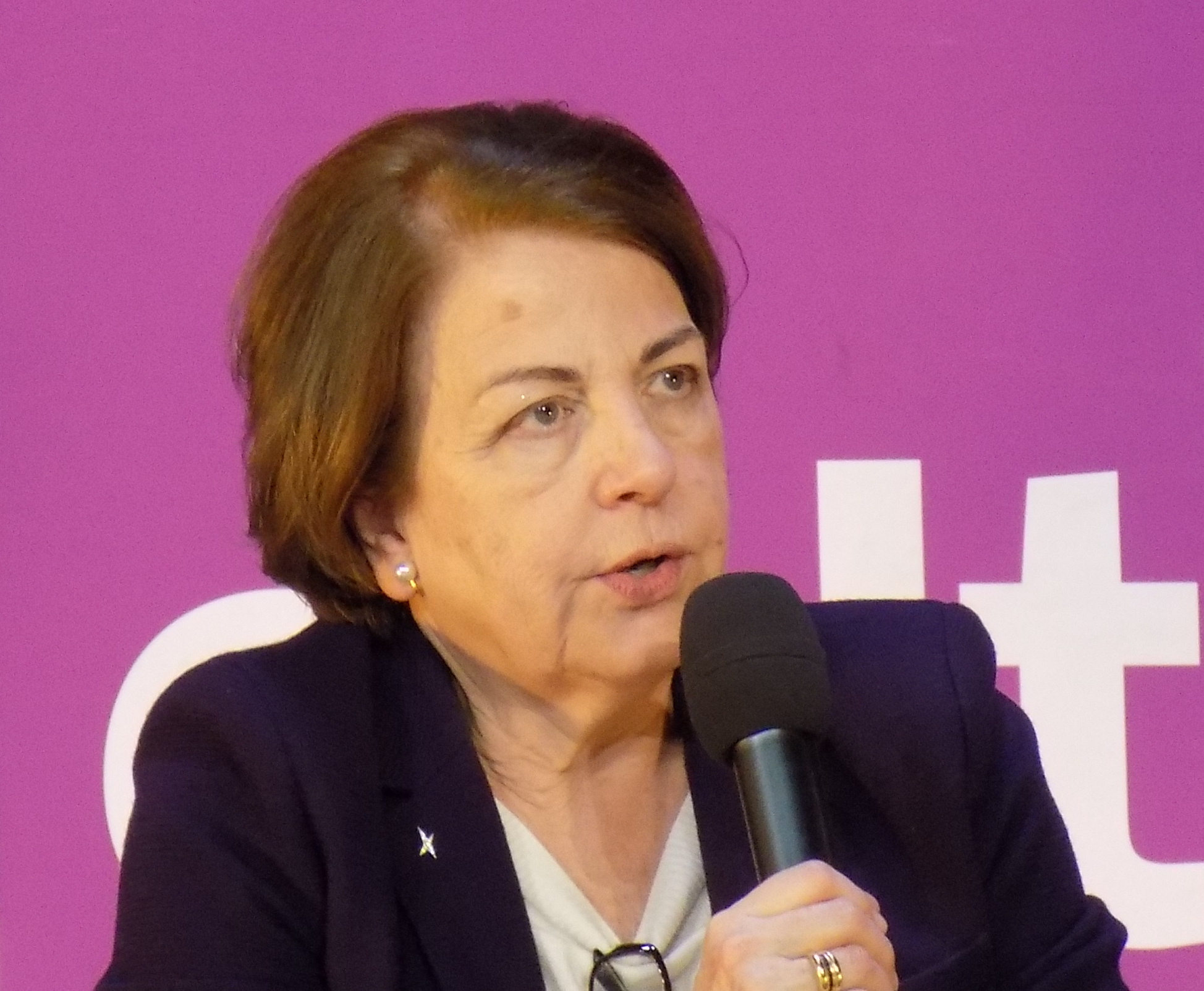
- Levasseur-Regourd in 2015
- Born: 16 April 1945
- Died: August 1, 2022 (aged 77)
- Education: École normale supérieure Cachan
- Occupation: Astronomer

Anny-Chantal Levasseur-Regourd (16 April 1945 – August 1, 2022) was a French astronomer known for her research on comet dust and interplanetary dust.

== Career and research ==
Levasseur-Regourd was a student at the École normale supérieure Cachan, and completed a PhD in 1976 on satellite observations of zodiacal light, under the direction of Jacques Blamont. In 1977, Levasseur-Regourd was the only woman among 53 finalists for the ESA astronaut program, although she never went to space. She became a professor at Pierre and Marie Curie University in 1985, and retired as professor emeritus in 2013.

She was the principal investigator for the Giotto Optical Probe Experiment, part of a mid-1980s ESA space mission to explore Halley's Comet. The instrument was still active during the probe's flyby of 26P/Grigg–Skjellerup and was used to make the first estimate of how close the flyby was.

== Recognition ==
Asteroid 6170 Levasseur, discovered in 1981, was named for her.

Levasseur-Regourd was the recipient of the Thorlet Prize of the French Academy of Sciences in 1976, the Glaxo Prize for scientific popularization in 1982, and the women's prize of the Société astronomique de France in 1986. She was named as an officer in the Legion of Honour in 2013.

== Books ==
Levasseur-Regourd's popular-press book L'atmosphère et ses phénomènes (1980) won the Glaxo Prize. She was also the author of two popular-press books on comets, Halley, le roman des comètes (with Philippe De La Cotardière, 1985), and L’exploration cométaire: De l'Antiquité à Rosetta (with Janet Borg, 2018).
