= Exozodiacal dust =

Small particles between exoplanets

This artist's view from an imagined planet around a nearby star shows the brilliant glow of exozodiacal light extending up into the sky and swamping the Milky Way.

Exozodiacal dust is 1–100 micrometre-sized grains of amorphous carbon and silicate dust that fill the plane of extrasolar planetary systems. It is the exoplanetary analog of zodiacal dust, the 1–100 micrometre-sized dust grains observed in the Solar System, especially interior to the asteroid belt. As with the zodiacal dust, these grains are probably produced by outgassing comets, as well as by collisions among bigger parent bodies like asteroids. Exozodiacal dust clouds are often components of debris disks that are detected around main-sequence stars through their excess infrared emission. Particularly hot exozodiacal disks are also commonly found near spectral type A-K stars. By convention, exozodiacal dust refers to the innermost and hottest part of these debris disks, within a few astronomical units of the star. How exozodiacal dust is so prevalent this close to stars is a subject of debate with several competing theories attempting to explain the phenomenon. The shapes of exozodiacal dust clouds can show the dynamical influence of extrasolar planets, and potentially indicate the presence of these planets. Because it is often located near a star's habitable zone, exozodiacal dust can be an important noise source for attempts to image terrestrial planets. Around 1 in 100 stars in the nearby planetary systems show a high content of warm dust that is around 1000 times greater than the average dust emission in the 8.5–12 μm range.

== Formation ==
Although such dust was initially theoretical, scientists have now observed its infrared signature while attempting to observe exo-Earths. As exozodiacal dust is the extrasolar equivalent of zodiacal dust, its formation is theorized to be the same. This is to be contrasted with interstellar dust, which is not trapped in a solar system. Leftover particulates from the formation of a planetary system, as well as debris from the collisions of larger objects leave behind exozodiacal dust. The amount of potential exozodiacal dust is thought to be ever-decreasing, though, as massive bodies like planets absorb significant amounts of it. For instance, the Earth absorbs 40,000 tons of this dust every year. The dust emits infrared radiation, and through gravitational interactions with bodies such as the Sun it forms infrared rings. These rings have been observed across many planetary systems throughout the Milky Way. Dust from different sources, such as from asteroid collisions, comets, and trapped particulates, are theorized to form different infrared structures, respectively.

== Examples of stars with exozodiacal dust ==
- 51 Ophiuchi
- Fomalhaut
- Tau Ceti
- Vega

== Ongoing research ==
Observations have found that some spectral type A-K have the infrared signatures of exozodiacal dust much closer to the star than is theorized to be possible. Within a certain circumference of the star, the dust is expected to be ground down and ejected by the star within a few years. While the dust has been confirmed to exist this close to a star, models still cannot explain its presence. Modeling the behavior of both zodiacal and exozodiacal dust is a noteworthy area of research, as the dust presents itself as noise for astronomers attempting to observe planetary bodies. If the dust can be accurately modeled, it can be subtracted out of observations of exo-Earths.
