= Surface Dust Analyser =

Mass spectrometer

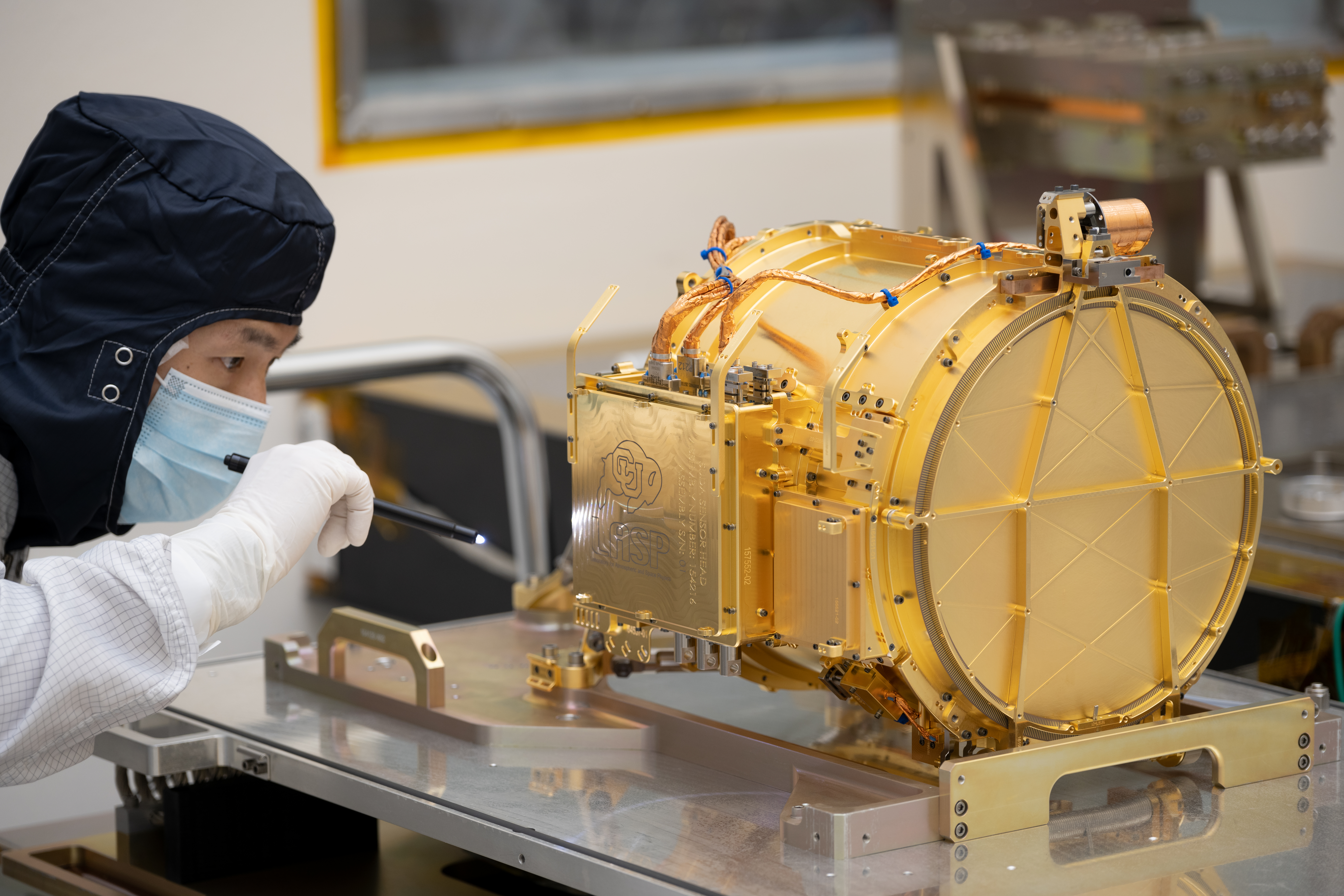
- Operator: NASA
- Manufacturer: University of Colorado Boulder
- Instrument type: Time-of-flight mass spectrometer
- Function: Mapping surface composition
- Mission duration: Cruise: 3-6 years Science phase: ≥ 3 years

Properties
- Mass: 5 kg (11 lb)
- Dimensions: 26.8 cm × 25.0 cm × 17.1 cm

Host spacecraft
- Spacecraft: Europa Clipper
- Operator: NASA
- Launch date: October 14, 2024, 16:06:00 UTC (12:06 pm EDT)
- Rocket: Falcon Heavy
- Launch site: Kennedy Space Center

The SUrface Dust Analyzer (SUDA) is a time-of-flight mass spectrometer of reflectron-type that employs impact ionization and is optimised for a high mass resolution. The instrument was selected in May 2015 to fly on board the Europa Clipper mission which was sent to Jupiter's moon Europa in October, 2024.

This instrument will measure the composition of small, solid particles ejected from Europa, providing the opportunity to directly sample the surface and potential plumes on low-altitude flybys. Europa's internal liquid water ocean has been identified as one of the locations in the Solar System that may offer habitable environments to microbial extraterrestrial life.

== Overview ==
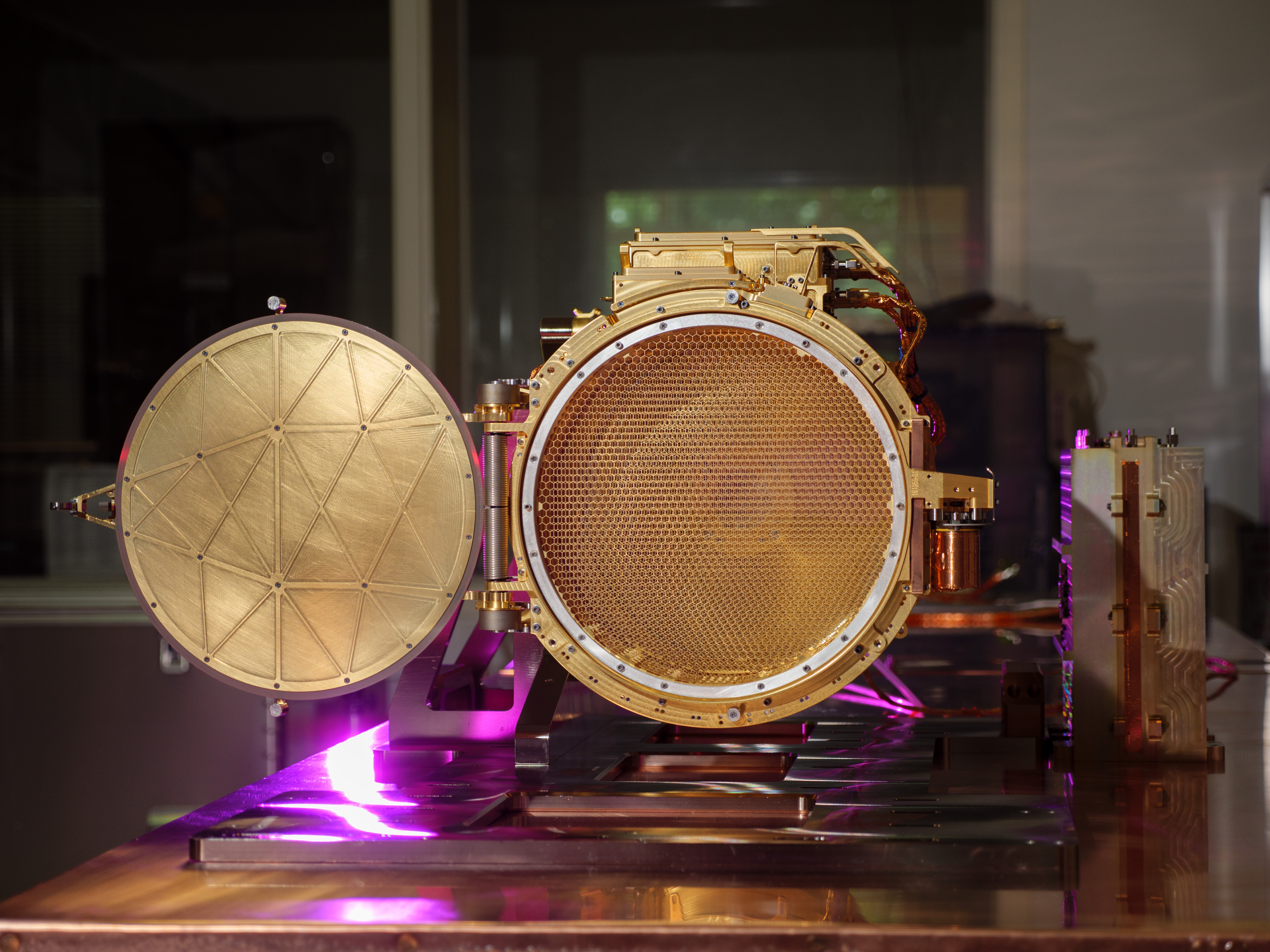
Europa Clipper's Dust Analyzer sensor head

The basic premise of compositional mapping is based on the idea that moons without an atmosphere are surrounded by clouds of dust particles released from their surfaces by micrometeoroid bombardment. The ejected particles can be sampled and their composition analyzed from orbit or during a spacecraft flyby. Since these grains are direct samples from the moons' icy surfaces, determination of their composition will help to define and constrain the geological activities on and below the moons' surface, the exchange processes with the deeper interior, and assess its internal ocean habitability potential. The instrument is capable of identifying traces of organic and inorganic compounds in the ice of ejecta.

The SUDA instrument has technological heritage from the Cassini CDA and the Stardust CIDA instruments. The Principal Investigator is Sascha Kempf, from the University of Colorado Boulder. Co-investigators on the instrument include Mihaly Horanyi and Zoltan Sternovsky.

Parameter	Units/performance
Mass	5 kg (11 lb)
Dimensions	26.8 cm × 25.0 cm × 17.1 cm
Sensitive area	220 cm^{2}
Effective mass resolution	200 to 250 m/Δm
Mass range of interest	1–250 Da

Scientists expect SUDA to be able to detect a single cell in an ice grain.

== Objectives ==
The SUDA objectives are:

- Provide a spatially resolved compositional map of Europa for the regions along the groundtracks of the orbiter's flybys.
- Characterize the alteration of Europa's surface via exogenous dust impacts by measuring the composition, size, speed, and spatial distribution of dust in the vicinity of the moon.
- Investigate the local plasma environment of Europa by measuring the electrostatic charge of dust particles in the vicinity of the moon.
