= Venetia Burney Student Dust Counter =

New Horizons Pluto space probe instrument launched 2006

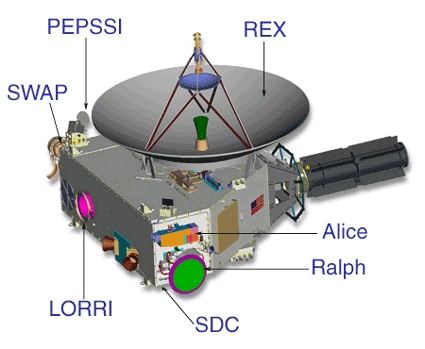
The Student Dust Counter (SDC), named the Venetia Burney Student Dust Counter (VBSDC) in June 2006 several months after New Horizons launch on a labeled diagram of the New Horizons spacecraft

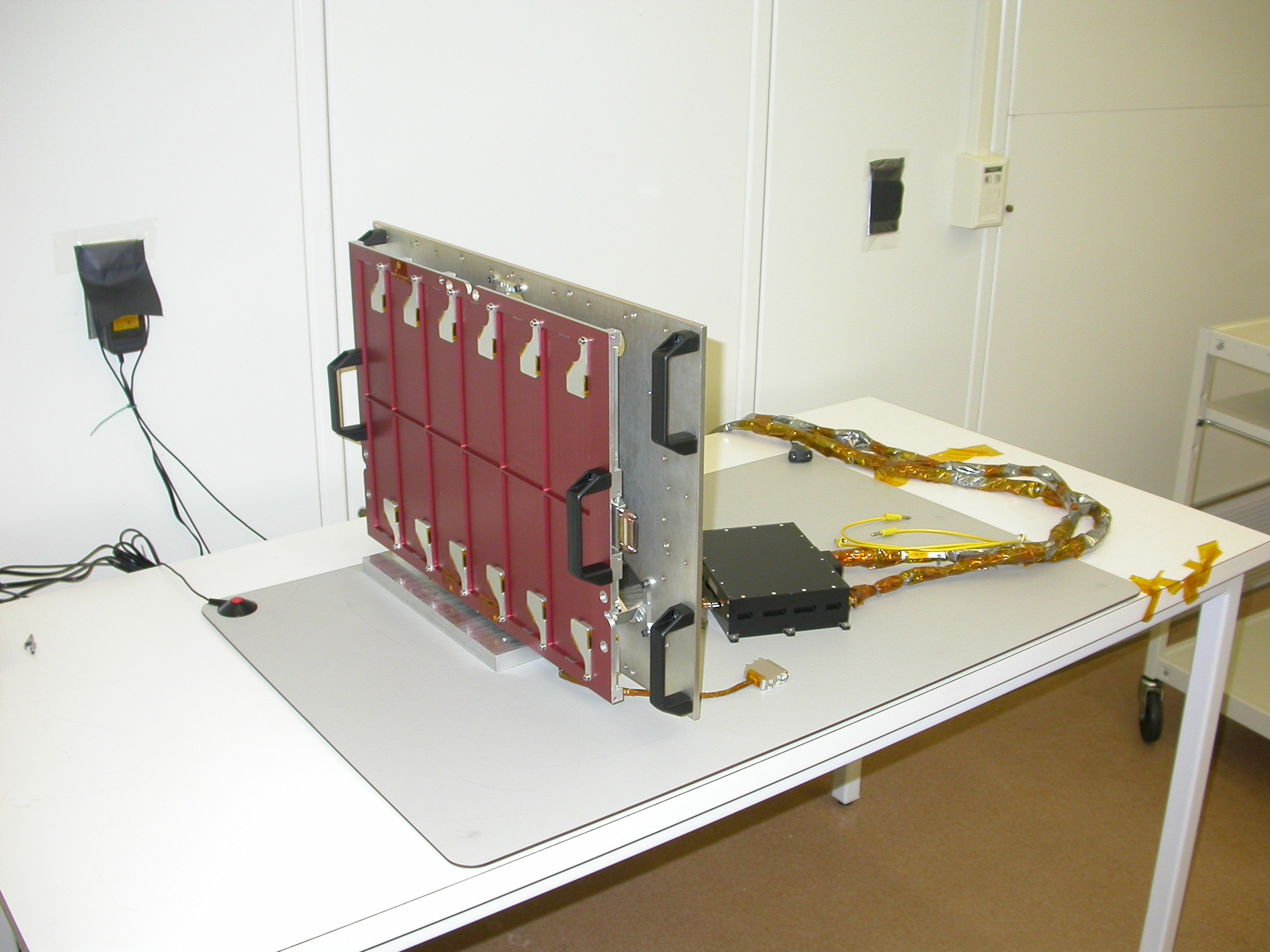
VBSDC—Venetia Burney Student Dust Counter

Animation of New Horizons' trajectory from 19 January 2006 to 30 December 2030 New Horizons · 486958 Arrokoth · Earth · 132524 APL · Jupiter · Pluto VBSDC can record micron size dust impacts on NH's route away from the Sun and past Pluto

The Venetia Burney Student Dust Counter (VBSDC) is a scientific instrument aboard the uncrewed New Horizons space probe that is designed to detect dust impacts in outer space. VBSDC is the first planetary science instrument to be built by students. The dust counter was launched in 2006, and named later that year after Venetia Burney, the young girl who originally named Pluto. The detector works when dust strikes films of polarized polyvinylidene fluoride (PVDF), which generates an electrical charge. The space dust is then detected over the course of the New Horizons spacecraft flight out of the Solar System and past Pluto.

== Overview ==
In 2010, VBSDC collected data on dust past 18 AU (1.67 billion miles), which is the distance the Pioneer 10 and Pioneer 11 dust counters stopped working. Five other spacecraft have carried dust detectors beyond the asteroid belt including Pioneer 10, Pioneer 11, Ulysses (heliocentric orbit out to the distance of Jupiter), Galileo (Jupiter Orbiter), and Cassini (Saturn orbiter). The Voyager 1 and Voyager 2 spacecraft did detect dust by using data from the Plasma Wave instrument, but did not have dedicated dust detection instruments. The Pioneer dust detectors stopped working at 18 AU.

The impacts of the dust is calculated to provide the mass and the velocity of the dust. One of the natural structures of the Solar System the VBSDC is designed to detect, is the Zodiacal cloud.

The instrument is 1 centimetre (0.39 in) thick and has a total collecting area of less than 0.1 square metres (1.1 sq ft) and is composed of 12 panels, each 14.2 centimetres (5.6 in) long and 6.5 centimetres (2.6 in) wide, meaning it has a width of 28.4 centimetres (11.2 in) and length of 39 centimetres (15 in). The instrument is designed to detect dust between 10 ng and 10 pg in mass and between 0.5 and 10 μm in size. By December 2008 it had taken dust measurements between 1.2 and 11.0 AU from the Sun. By April 2012, the dust counter had produced data up to 23 AU.

The direction of the dust impact is calculated by noting what direction the instrument is facing due to the orientation of the spacecraft. The instrument has very low power consumption.

Examples of periods of Measurements:

- 6.76-7.10 A.U.
- 9.02-9.91 A.U.
- 10.01-10.80 A.U.
- 11.91-13.84 A.U.
- 14.29-15.51 A.U

Data collected in the inner Solar System was compared to similar data from Galileo and Ulysses spacecraft.

VBSDC recorded the first measurements of sub-micron space dust in the outer Solar System. In the outer Solar System VBSDC recorded an average flux of dust of grain size larger than 2 × 10^{−12} grams of 2.5 × 10^{−4} m^{−2} s^{−1}.

The dust detection within the orbit of Jupiter registered by the VBSDC were compared to previous observations by dust detectors on the Ulysses and Galileo spacecraft. The results from VBSDC were consistent with the previously recorded data.

The VBSDC was designed and is operated by students at the University of Colorado’s Laboratory for Atmospheric and Space Physics. Between 2002 and 2010 there were 32 students that worked on the project. By 2010 there was team of about a half-dozen students working on the mission, but the team was as large as 20 students at its start. The students were typically undergraduate or graduate level, with participants rotated in and out of the project over time.

== Naming ==
In June 2006 the student dust counter was named in honor of Venetia Phair (née Burney) who came up with the name Pluto in the 1930s as a girl, and she was given a plaque related to this naming in December, 2006. Venetia suggested the name Pluto after the discovery of the new planet by Clyde Tombaugh in 1930 at Lowell Observatory. The name Pluto was selected in a vote by the observatory's astronomers.

In 2006, the NH Principal Investigator was able to present Venetia with a plaque about the naming of the Venetia Burney Student Dust Counter after her.

Previously the instrument was called the Student Dust Counter.

== See also ==
- List of New Horizons topics
- Venetia Burney
