= Tony McDonnell (space scientist) =

English space scientist

- Born: James Anthony Michael McDonnell; 1938 (age 87–88)
- Citizenship: British
- Known for: Cosmic dust research; Hypervelocity impact studies; Contributions to ESA and NASA missions including Stardust and Cassini–Huygens
- Scientific career
- Fields: Planetary science; Space science
- Workplaces: University of Kent; Open University

Tony McDonnell (also published as J.A.M. McDonnell), born James Anthony Michael McDonnell, is a Professor (Emeritus) of Planetary and Space Sciences. Specialising in space science and a recognised authority in cosmic dust, he was Professor of Space Sciences at the University of Kent and Professor of Planetary and Space Sciences at the Open University.

== Space Science ==
Tony McDonnell started his career at the Jodrell Bank Observatory, providing the opportunity for space research, where innovative satellite-borne detectors were developed to measure the threat to survival in space environments. They were to be his career speciality.

Following a NASA fellowship, he joined the University of Kent in 1967 and, over 30 years, successfully developed the Unit for Space Sciences and Astronomy. His research included analysis of Moon rocks from NASA Apollo Programme and USSR Luna missions; hypervelocity impacts and specialised facilities; experiments during Giotto's flyby of Halleys Comet; and interplanetary explorations by the Ulysses and Galileo probes. Together with Peter Tsou and Don Brownlee, he was the first to demonstrate the intact capture of space particulates in aerogel, the baseline technique used in the Stardust Mission.

He has played a significant role in the UK framework and funding for the exploration of space, including the Rosetta, Stardust, Cassini/Huygens missions and the International Space Station facilities. In 1984, the International Astronomical Union named asteroid 9159 McDonnell after him. He is also author of Cosmic Dust, a milestone in Solar System Cosmic Dust Research.

He led experimental work using Kent's 2 MV Van de Graaff accelerator, producing several technical reports for the United States Air Force / EOARD on energy partitioning in hypervelocity impacts.

In 2000, he and his team moved from the University of Kent to form the UK's largest space team at the Open University and triggered the building of the Planetary and Space Sciences Research Institute.

== Research contributions ==
=== Cosmic dust and micrometeoroids ===
McDonnell's research helped distinguish natural micrometeoroid particles from artificial space debris using scanning electron microscopy, spectroscopic analysis, morphological classification, and impact‑residue chemistry. His work contributed to understanding the dust environment in low Earth orbit and its implications for spacecraft design.

=== Hypervelocity impact physics ===
McDonnell authored a major USAF/EOARD report on energy partitioning during hypervelocity impacts, analysing plasma generation, ejecta momentum, shock behaviour, and material response at velocities exceeding 5 km/s.

=== NASA and ESA mission involvement ===
McDonnell contributed to scientific analysis associated with:

- NASA's Long Duration Exposure Facility (LDEF)
- Micrometeoroid and debris impact studies
- Early European cosmic dust instrumentation programmes

== Personal life ==
He is now retired and working on a barn renovation in Dordogne, France. A friend has helped.
