= Impact ionization =

Process in atomic physics

An example of an incoming electron impact ionizing to produce a new electron-hole pair

Impact ionization is the process in a material by which one energetic charge carrier can lose energy by the creation of other charge carriers. For example, in semiconductors, an electron (or hole) with enough kinetic energy can knock a bound electron out of its bound state (in the valence band) and promote it to a state in the conduction band, creating an electron-hole pair. For carriers to have sufficient kinetic energy a sufficiently large electric field must be applied, in essence requiring a sufficiently large voltage but not necessarily a large current.

If this occurs in a region of high electrical field then it can result in avalanche breakdown. This process is exploited in avalanche diodes, by which a small optical signal is amplified before entering an external electronic circuit. In an avalanche photodiode the original charge carrier is created by the absorption of a photon.

The impact ionization process is used in modern cosmic dust detectors like the Galileo Dust Detector and dust analyzers Cassini CDA, Stardust CIDA and the Surface Dust Analyser for the identification of dust impacts and the compositional analysis of cosmic dust particles.

In some sense, impact ionization is the reverse process to Auger recombination.

Avalanche photodiodes (APD) are used in optical receivers. Before the signal is given to the receiver circuitry the photon is multiplied with the photocurrent and this increases the sensitivity of the receiver since photocurrent is multiplied before encountering of the thermal noise associated with the receiver circuit.

== See also ==
- Multiphoton ionization
- Avalanche breakdown
- Avalanche diode
- Avalanche photodiode
