= Diamond dust =

Ground-level cloud of ice crystals

Diamond dust is a ground-level cloud composed of tiny ice crystals. This meteorological phenomenon is also referred to simply as ice crystals and is reported in the METAR code as IC. Diamond dust generally forms under otherwise clear or nearly clear skies, so it is sometimes referred to as clear-sky precipitation. Diamond dust is most commonly observed in Antarctica and the Arctic, but can occur anywhere with a temperature well below freezing. In the polar regions of Earth, diamond dust may persist for several days without interruption.

== Characteristics ==
Falling diamond dust (Inari, Finland)

Diamond dust is similar to fog in that it is a cloud based at the surface; however, it differs from fog in two main ways. Generally fog refers to a cloud composed of liquid water (the term ice fog usually refers to a fog that formed as liquid water and then froze, and frequently seems to occur in valleys with airborne pollution such as Fairbanks, Alaska, while diamond dust forms directly as ice). Also, fog is a dense-enough cloud to significantly reduce visibility, while diamond dust is usually very thin and may not have any effect on visibility (there are far fewer crystals in a volume of air than there are droplets in the same volume with fog). Because mist is often classified to be more transparent than fog, diamond dust has often been referred to as ice mist. However, diamond dust still can often reduce the visibility, in some cases to under 600 m (2,000 ft).

The depth of the diamond dust layer can vary substantially from as little as 20 to 30 m (66 to 98 ft) to 300 metres (980 ft). Because diamond dust does not always reduce visibility it is often first noticed by the brief flashes caused when the tiny crystals, tumbling through the air, reflect sunlight to the eye. This glittering effect gives the phenomenon its name since it looks like many tiny diamonds are flashing in the air.

Serial Photos of Diamond Dust

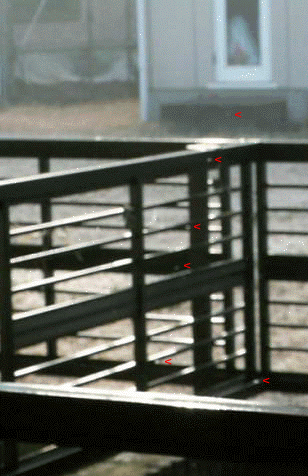
Diamond dust briefly observed at Tsukuba, Japan. These are serial photos out of a movie; note differences in crystal locations.

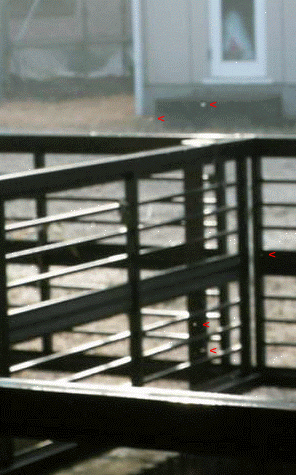
Temperature was −2 °C, relative humidity was almost 100%. These photos captured only the glittering particles.

== Formation ==
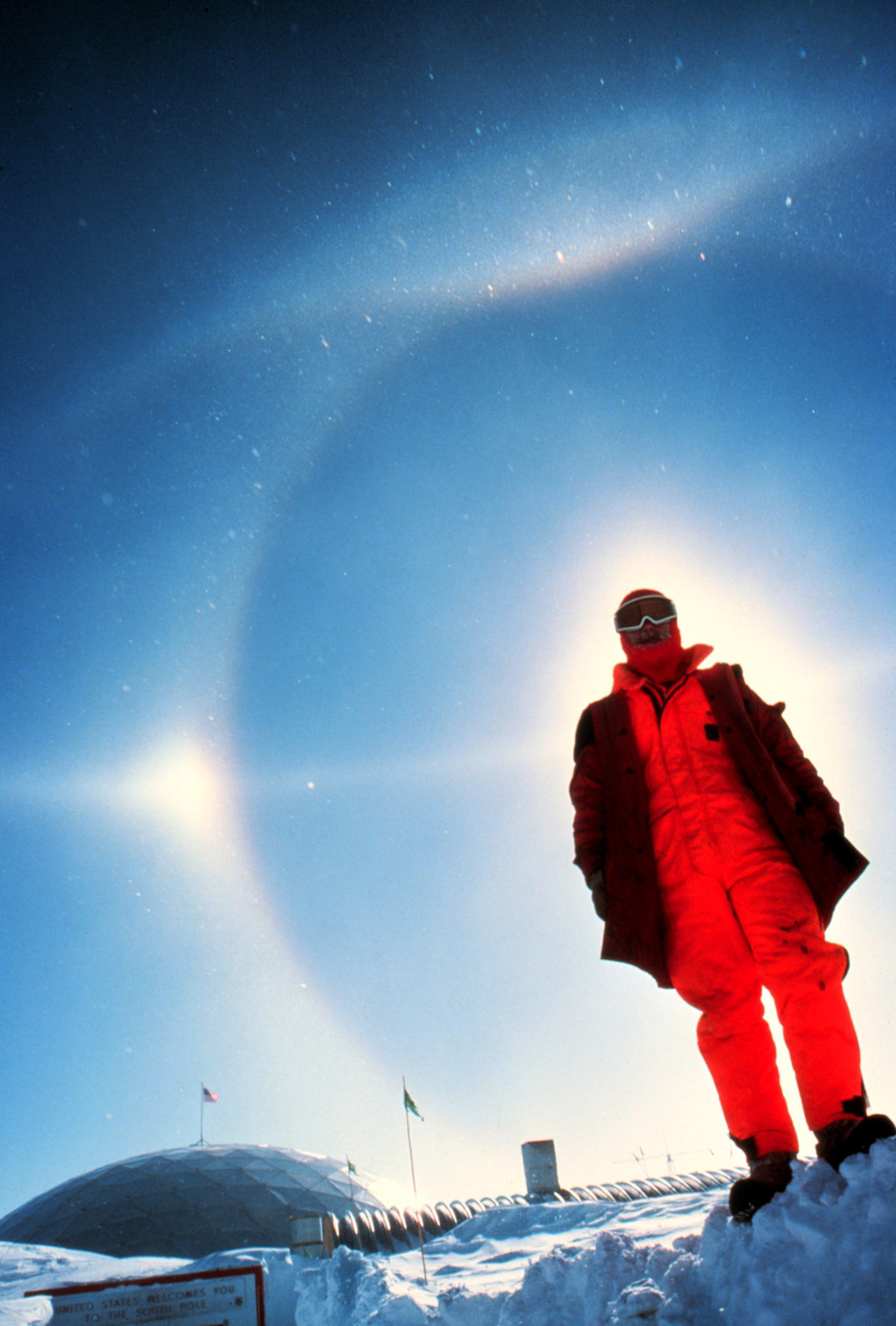
Halo display at the South Pole (1980), featuring a parhelion, 22° halo, parhelic circle, upper tangent arc and Parry arc. Diamond dust is visible as point-like reflections of individual crystals close to the camera.

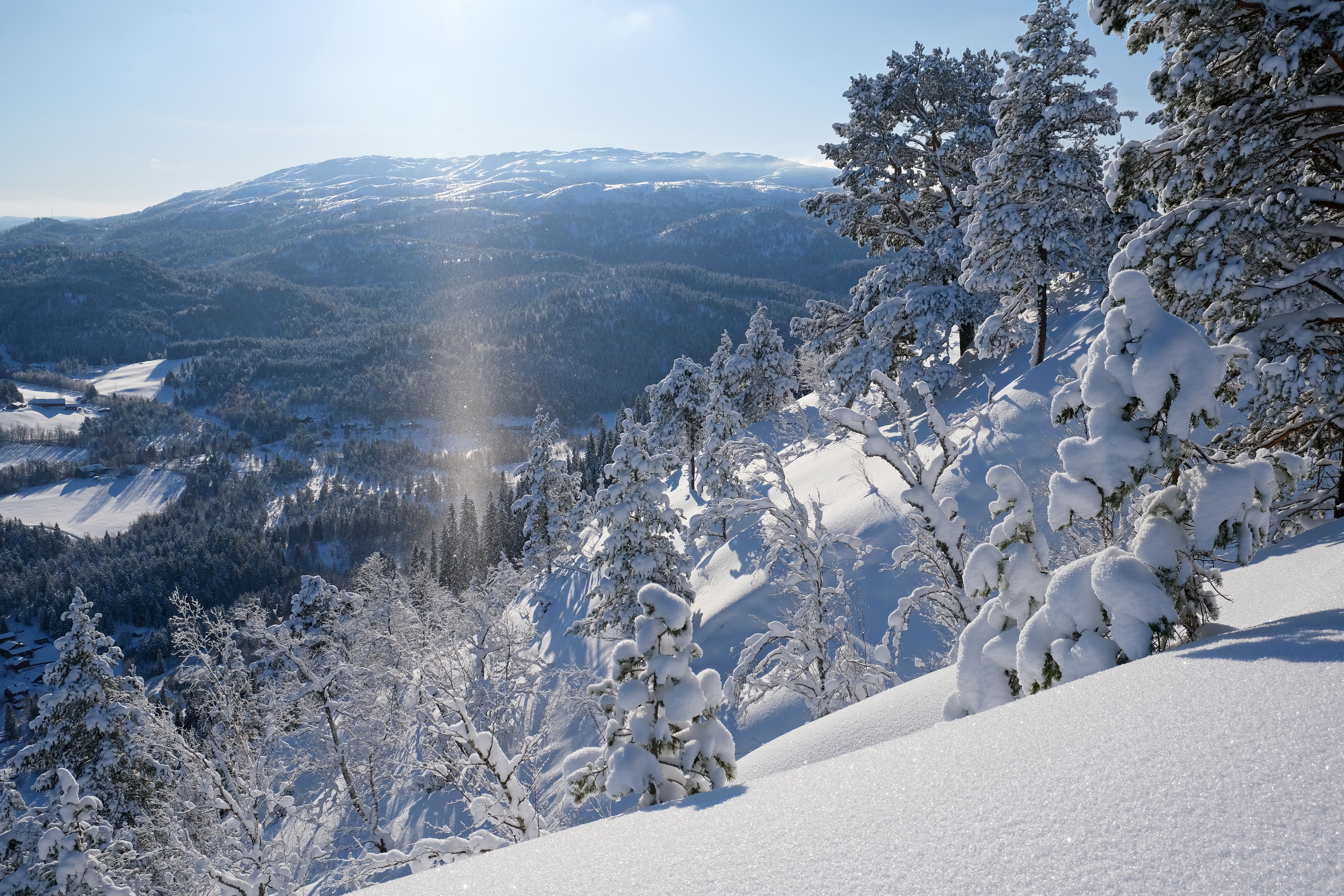
Diamond dust in Løkken Verk, Norway.

These ice crystals usually form when a temperature inversion is present at the surface and the warmer air above the ground mixes with the colder air near the surface. Since warmer air frequently contains more water vapor than colder air, this mixing will usually also transport water vapor into the air near the surface, causing the relative humidity of the near-surface air to increase. If the relative humidity increase near the surface is large enough then ice crystals may form.

To form diamond dust the temperature must be below the freezing point of water, 0 °C (32 °F), or the ice cannot form or would melt. However, diamond dust is not often observed at temperatures near 0 °C (32 °F). At temperatures between 0 °C (32 °F) and about −39 °C (−38 °F) increasing the relative humidity can cause either fog or diamond dust. This is because very small droplets of water can remain liquid well below the freezing point, a state known as supercooled water. In areas with a lot of small particles in the air, from human pollution or natural sources like dust, the water droplets are likely to be able to freeze at a temperature around −10 °C (14 °F), but in very clean areas, where there are no particles (ice nuclei) to help the droplets freeze, they can remain liquid to −39 °C (−38 °F), at which point even very tiny, pure water droplets will freeze. In the interior of Antarctica diamond dust is fairly common at temperatures below about −25 °C (−13 °F).

Artificial diamond dust can form from snow machines which blow ice crystals into the air. These are found at ski resorts. Diamond dust may also be observed immediately downwind from manufacturing facilities or chilled water plants that produce steam.

== Optical properties ==
Diamond dust is often associated with halos, such as sun dogs, light pillars, etc. Like the ice crystals in cirrus or cirrostratus clouds, diamond dust crystals form directly as simple hexagonal ice crystals – as opposed to freezing drops – and generally form slowly. This combination results in crystals with well defined shapes – usually either hexagonal plates or columns – which, like a prism, can reflect and/or refract light in specific directions.

== Climatology ==
While diamond dust can be seen in any area of the world that has cold winters, it is most frequent in the interior of Antarctica, where it is common year-round. Schwerdtfeger (1970) shows that diamond dust was observed on average 316 days a year at Plateau Station in Antarctica, and Radok and Lile (1977) estimate that over 70% of the precipitation that fell at Plateau Station in 1967 fell in the form of diamond dust. Once melted, the total precipitation for the year was only 25 mm (0.98 in).

== Weather reporting and interference ==
Diamond dust may sometimes cause a problem for automated airport weather stations. The ceilometer and visibility sensor do not always correctly interpret the falling diamond dust and report the visibility and ceiling as zero (overcast skies). However, a human observer would correctly notice clear skies and unrestricted visibility. The METAR identifier for diamond dust within international hourly weather reports is IC.

== See also ==
- Crepuscular rays
- Light beam
- False sunrise
- False sunset
