= List of atmospheric optical phenomena =

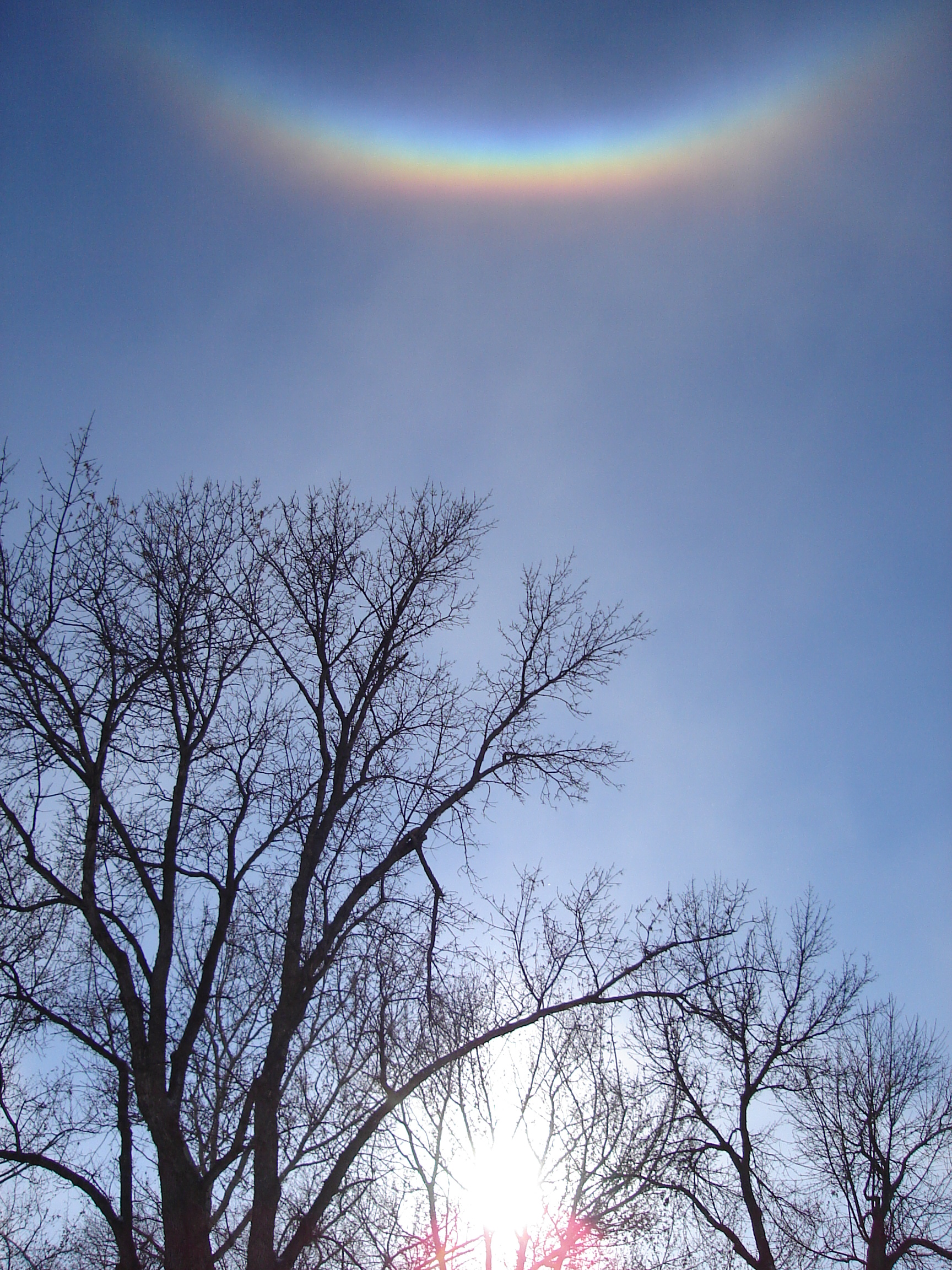
A circumzenithal arc over Grand Forks, North Dakota

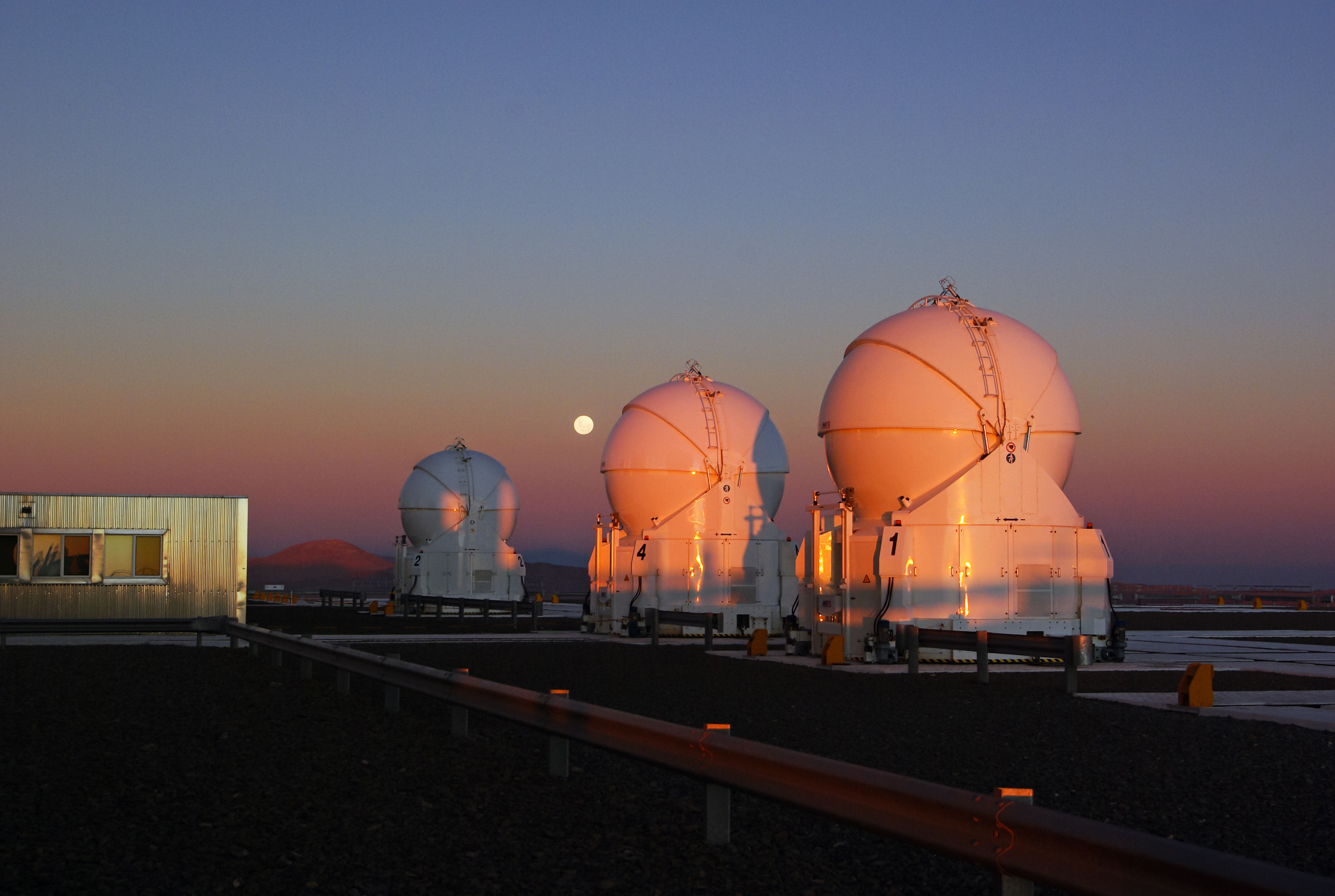
The Belt of Venus over Paranal Observatory atop Cerro Paranal in the Atacama Desert, northern Chile

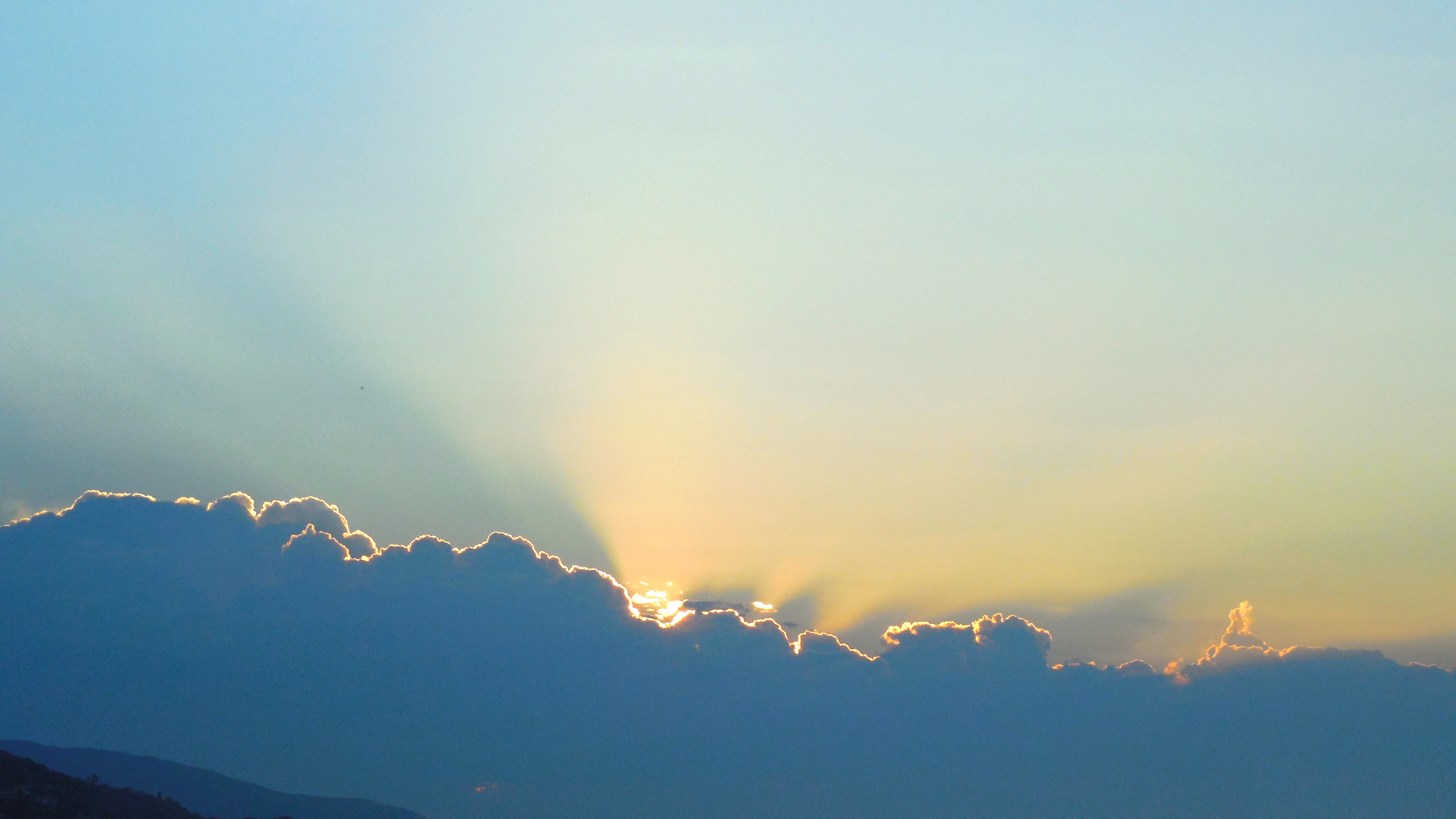
Crepuscular rays at sunrise in Malibu, California

Atmospheric optical phenomena include:

- Afterglow
- Airglow
- Alexander's band, the dark region between the two bows of a double rainbow.
- Alpenglow
- Anthelion
- Anticrepuscular rays
- Aurora (northern and southern lights, aurora borealis and aurora australis)
- Belt of Venus
- Brocken Spectre
- Circumhorizontal arc
- Circumzenithal arc
- Cloud iridescence
- Crepuscular rays
- Earth's shadow
- Earthquake lights
- Glories
- Green flash
- Halos, of Sun or Moon, including sun dogs
- Haze
- Heiligenschein or halo effect, partly caused by the opposition effect
- Ice blink
- Light pillar
- Lightning
- Mirages (including Fata Morgana)
- Monochrome Rainbow
- Moon dog
- Moonbow
- Nacreous cloud/Polar stratospheric cloud
- Rainbow
- Sprite (lightning)
- STEVE
- Subsun
- Sun dog
- Tangent arc
- Tyndall effect
- Upper-atmospheric lightning, including red sprites, Blue jets, and ELVES
- Water sky

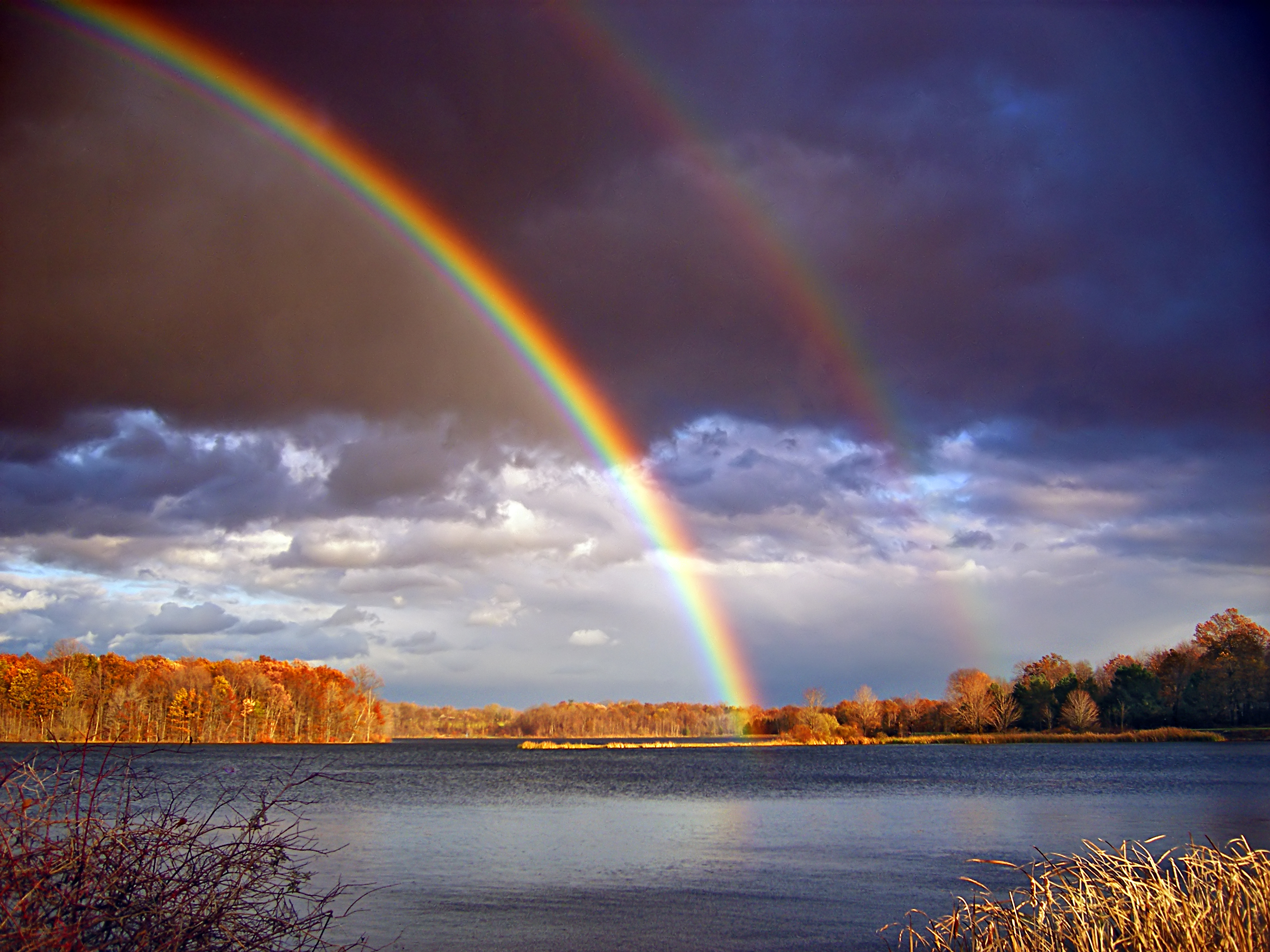
A double rainbow at Minsi Lake, Pennsylvania

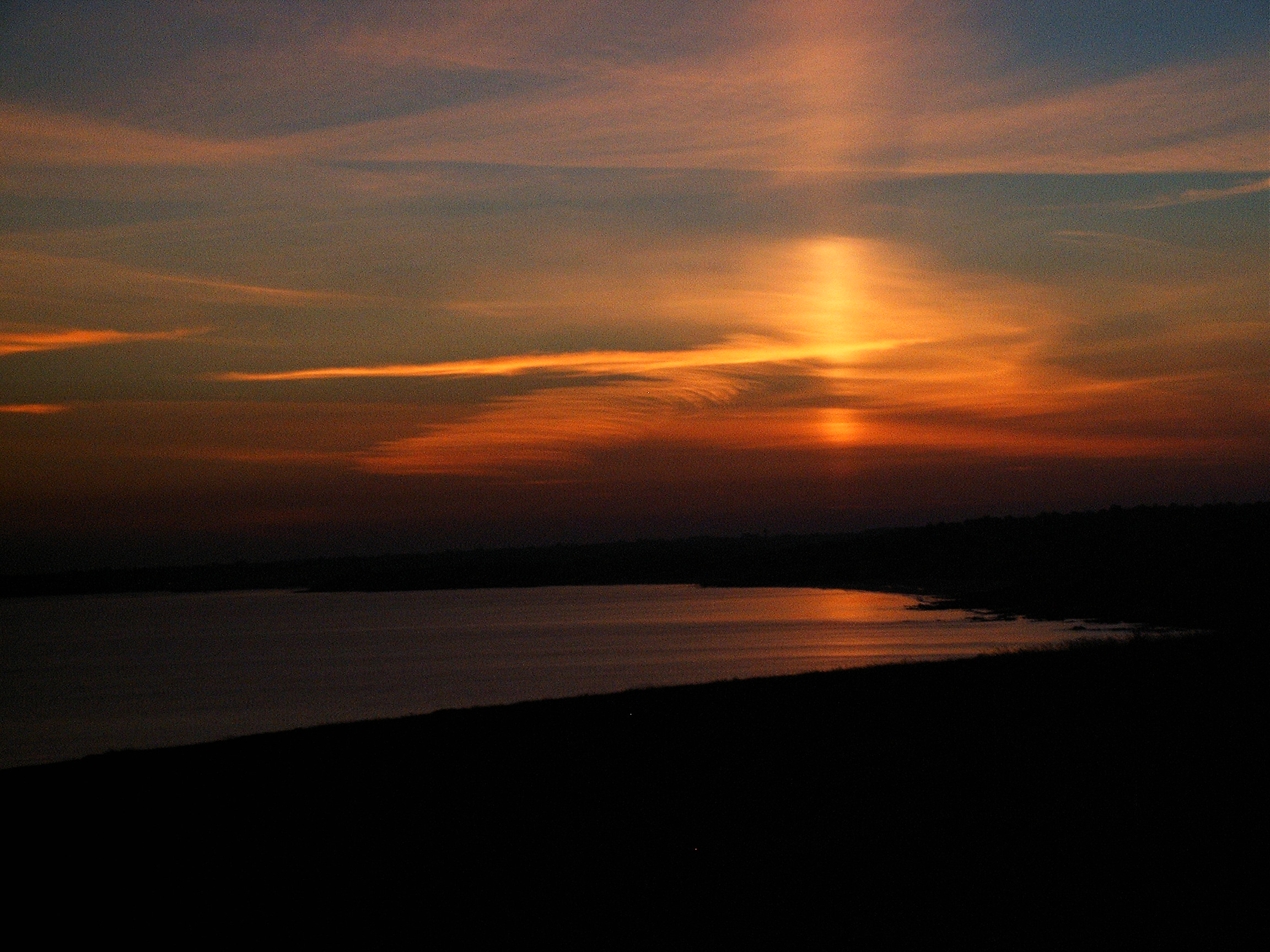
A sun pillar in Finistère, Brittany

Atmospheric optical phenomenon
