= False sunset =

Atmospheric optical phenomena

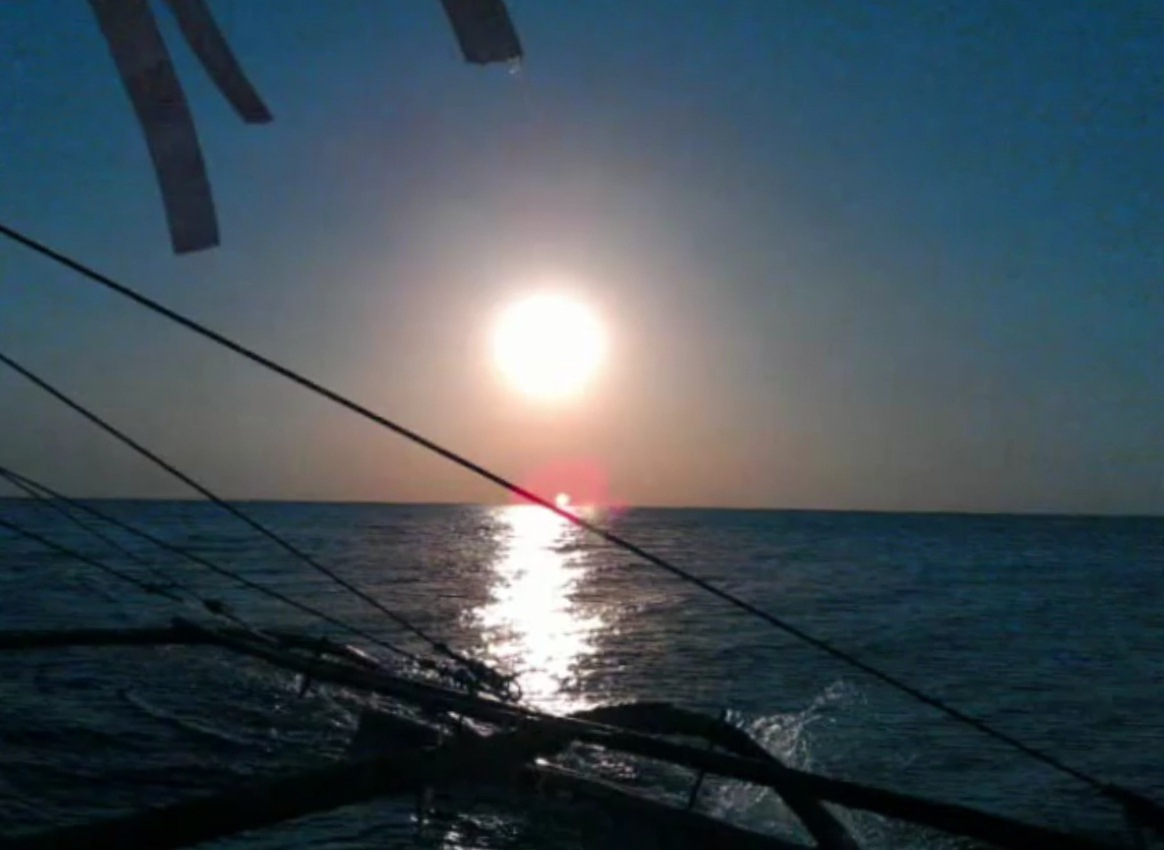
An example of what a false sunset would look like

A false sunset can refer to one of two related atmospheric optical phenomena: (1) the Sun appears to be setting into or to have set below the horizon while it is actually still some height above the horizon; or (2) the Sun has already set below the horizon, but still appears to be on or above the horizon (thus representing the reverse of a false sunrise). Depending on the circumstances, these phenomena can give the impression of an actual sunset.

There are several atmospheric conditions which may cause the effect, most commonly a type of halo, caused by the reflection and refraction of sunlight by small ice crystals in the atmosphere, often in the form of cirrostratus clouds. Depending on which variety of "false sunset" is meant, the halo has to appear either above the Sun (which itself is hidden below the horizon) or below it (in which case the real Sun is obstructed from view, e.g. by clouds or other objects), making the upper and lower tangent arcs, upper and lower sun pillars and the subsun the most likely candidates.

Similarly to a false sunrise, other atmospheric circumstances may be responsible for the effect as well, such as simple reflection of the sunlight off the bottom of the clouds, or a type of mirage like the Novaya Zemlya effect.

== See also ==
- False sunrise
- Halo (optical phenomenon)
- Lower tangent arc
- Mirage
- Novaya Zemlya effect
- Subsun
- Sun pillar
- Upper tangent arc
