= Lunar eclipse =

Natural phenomenon wherein the Earth casts a shadow on the Moon

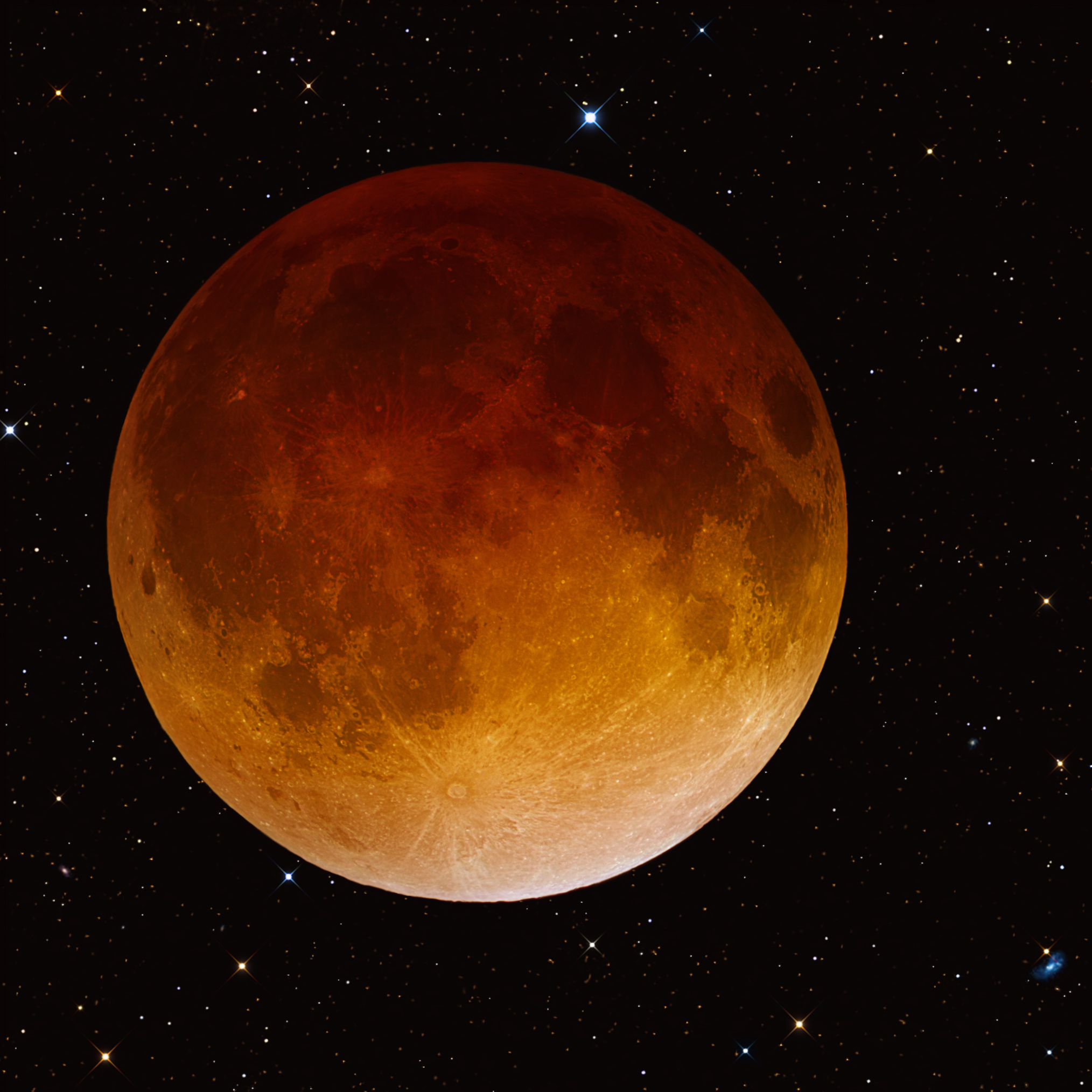
Composite image of the April 2014 total lunar eclipse as viewed from Charleston, West Virginia

A schematic diagram of the shadow cast by Earth. Within the umbra, the central region, the planet totally shields direct sunlight. In contrast, within the penumbra, the outer portion, the sunlight is only partially blocked. Sun, Moon, and Earth sizes and distances between them not to scale.

A lunar eclipse, also called a blood moon, is an astronomical event that occurs when the Moon orbits through Earth's shadow.‍‍ Lunar eclipses occur during eclipse season, when the Moon's orbital plane is approximately in line with Earth and the Sun. The type and length of a lunar eclipse depend on the Moon's proximity to the lunar node.‍‍

In contrast with elusive and short-lasting solar eclipses, lunar eclipses can be observed from anywhere on the night side of Earth and often last for an hour or longer. Lunar eclipses are safe to observe without eye protection.

Lunar eclipses cause the Moon to appear orange or red. This occurs because when the Moon passes through the Earth's umbra, any sunlight that reaches the Moon must first pass through the Earth's atmosphere. The resulting Rayleigh scattering removes short-wavelength colors such as violet and blue from the light before it reflects back off the lunar surface and is observed on Earth.

== Types of lunar eclipses ==
=== Penumbral lunar eclipse ===
A penumbral lunar eclipse occurs when Earth's silhouette partially blocks the Sun in the lunar sky but does not occlude it completely, ensuring some sunlight can still reach the Moon directly. The designation refers to the Moon being partially inside the penumbra, which describes the region of any shadow that is cast by a light source which is not collimated and has a non-zero angular diameter. A penumbral eclipse is designated as a total penumbral eclipse if the Moon lies exclusively inside of the penumbra.

Penumbral eclipses are observed from Earth as a subtle dimming of the lunar surface. Of all lunar eclipses, approximately one-third are penumbral eclipses; of those, only 3% are total penumbral eclipses.

Partiality of the eclipse on 17 July 2019 observed from Gloucestershire, UK

Timelapse of the total lunar eclipse on 4 March 2007

=== Partial lunar eclipse ===
A partial lunar eclipse refers to the Moon lying partially inside of the umbra, where the relative size of the Earth in the lunar sky allows it to block the Sun entirely. During a partial eclipse, the dark region covered by the umbra will appear much more distinct than the penumbral dimming.

The Moon's average orbital speed is about 1.03 km/s (2,300 mph), or a little more than its diameter per hour, so totality may last up to nearly 107 minutes. Nevertheless, the total time between the first and last contacts of the Moon's limb with Earth's shadow is much longer and could last up to 236 minutes.‍

=== Total lunar eclipse ===
When the Moon's near side entirely passes into the Earth's umbral shadow, a total lunar eclipse occurs. Just prior to complete entry, the brightness of the lunar limb—the curved edge of the Moon still being hit by direct sunlight—will cause the rest of the Moon to appear comparatively dim. The moment the Moon enters a complete eclipse, the entire surface will become more or less uniformly bright, being able to reveal stars surrounding it. Later, as the Moon's opposite limb is struck by sunlight, the overall disk will again become obscured.

This is because, as viewed from the Earth, the brightness of a lunar limb is generally greater than that of the rest of the surface, due to reflections from the many surface irregularities within the limb: sunlight striking these irregularities is always reflected back in greater quantities than that striking more central parts, which is why the edges of full moons generally appear brighter than the rest of the lunar surface. This is similar to the effect of velvet fabric over a convex curved surface, which, to an observer, will appear darkest at the center of the curve. It will be true of any planetary body with little or no atmosphere and an irregular cratered surface (e.g., Mercury) when viewed opposite the Sun.‍

The Moon does not completely darken as it passes through the umbra because of the refraction of sunlight by Earth's atmosphere into the shadow cone; if Earth had no atmosphere, the Moon would be completely dark during the eclipse.‍ The reddish coloration arises because sunlight reaching the Moon must pass through a long and dense layer of Earth's atmosphere, where it is scattered. Shorter wavelengths are more likely to be scattered by the air molecules and small particles; thus, the longer wavelengths predominate by the time the light rays have penetrated the atmosphere. Human vision perceives this resulting light as red. This is the same effect that causes sunsets and sunrises to turn the sky a reddish color.‍ An alternative way of conceiving this scenario is to realize that, as viewed from the Moon, the Sun would appear to be setting (or rising) behind Earth.

The amount of refracted light depends on the amount of dust or clouds in the atmosphere; this also controls how much light is scattered. In general, the dustier the atmosphere, the more that other wavelengths of light will be removed (compared to red light), leaving the resulting light a deeper red color. This causes the resulting coppery-red hue of the Moon to vary from one eclipse to the next. Volcanoes are notable for expelling large quantities of dust into the atmosphere, and a large eruption shortly before an eclipse can have a large effect on the resulting color.‍

=== Central lunar eclipse ===
When, during a total lunar eclipse, the Moon passes near and through the centre of Earth's shadow, contacting the antisolar point, it is classified as a central lunar eclipse.‍ This type of lunar eclipse is more frequent, occurring in 59.6% of all total lunar eclipses.‍

The relative distance of the Moon from Earth at the time of an eclipse can affect the eclipse's duration. In particular, when the Moon is near apogee, the farthest point from Earth in its orbit, its orbital speed is the slowest. The diameter of Earth's umbra does not decrease appreciably within the changes in the Moon's orbital distance. Thus, the concurrence of a totally eclipsed Moon near apogee will lengthen the duration of totality.‍

=== Selenelion ===
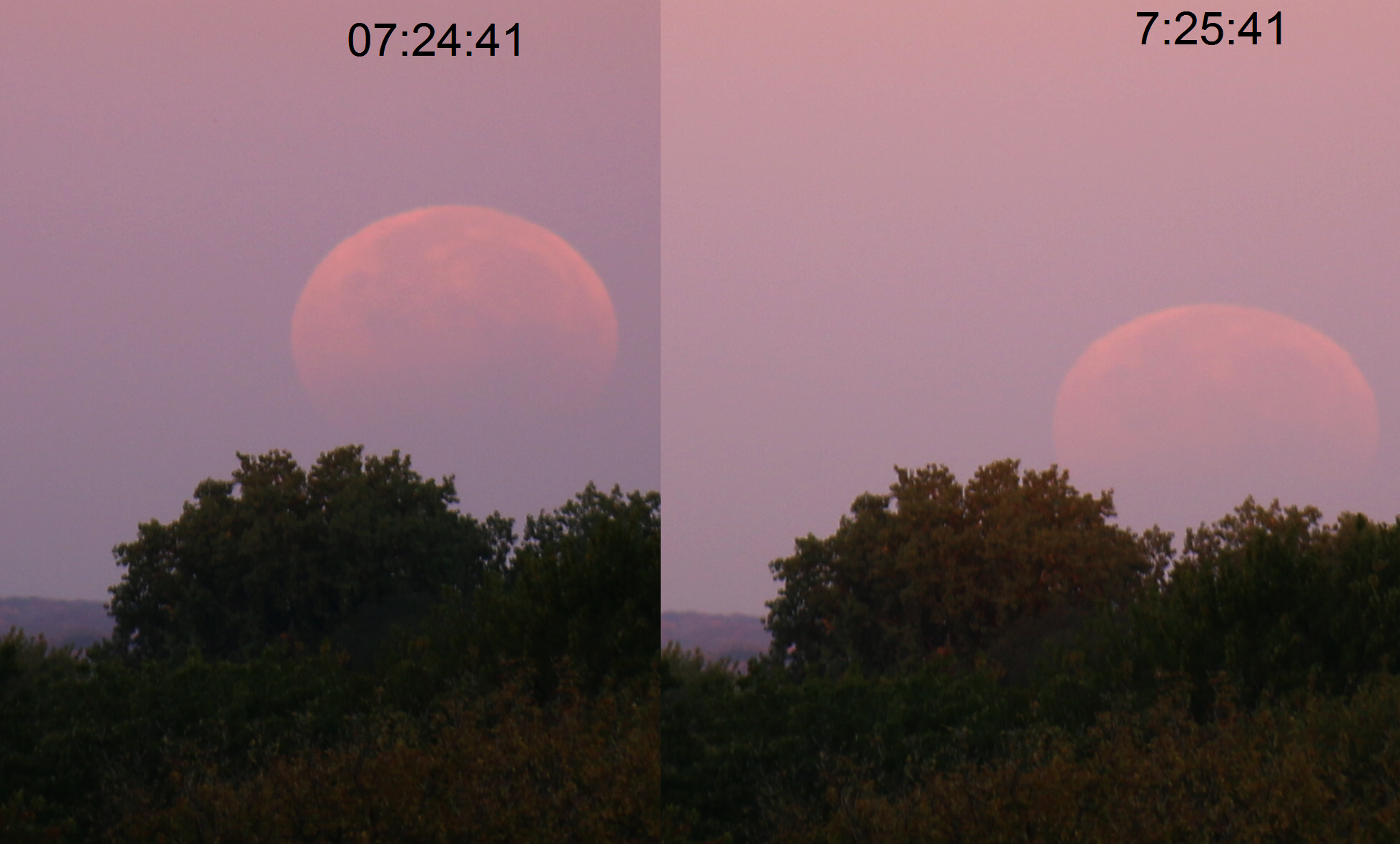
October 2014 lunar eclipse viewed from Minneapolis during sunrise on 8 October 2014. Both the Moon and Sun were visible at that time.‍

A selenelion or selenehelion, also called a horizontal eclipse, occurs where and when both the Sun and an eclipsed Moon can be observed at the same time. The event can only be observed just before sunset or just after sunrise, when both bodies will appear just above opposite horizons at nearly opposite points in the sky. A selenelion occurs during every total lunar eclipse—it is an experience of the observer, not a planetary event separate from the lunar eclipse itself. Typically, observers on Earth located on high mountain ridges undergoing false sunrise or false sunset at the same moment of a total lunar eclipse will be able to experience it. Although during selenelion the Moon is completely within the Earth's umbra, both it and the Sun can be observed in the sky because atmospheric refraction causes each body to appear higher (i.e., more central) in the sky than its true geometric planetary position.‍

== Timing ==
Contact points relative to the Earth's umbral and penumbral shadows, here with the Moon near its descending node

The timing of total lunar eclipses is determined by what are known as its "contacts" (moments of contact with Earth's shadow):‍

- P1 (First contact): Beginning of the penumbral eclipse. Earth's penumbra touches the Moon's outer limb.
- U1 (Second contact): Beginning of the partial eclipse. Earth's umbra touches the Moon's outer limb.
- U2 (Third contact): Beginning of the total eclipse. The Moon's surface is entirely within Earth's umbra.
- Greatest eclipse: The peak stage of the total eclipse. The Moon is at its closest to the center of Earth's umbra.
- U3 (Fourth contact): End of the total eclipse. The Moon's outer limb exits Earth's umbra.
- U4 (Fifth contact): End of the partial eclipse. Earth's umbra leaves the Moon's surface.
- P4 (Sixth contact): End of the penumbral eclipse. Earth's penumbra no longer makes contact with the Moon.

== Danjon scale ==
The Moon does not completely darken as it passes through the umbra because Earth's atmosphere refracts sunlight into the shadow cone.

The following scale (the Danjon scale) was devised by André Danjon for rating the overall darkness of lunar eclipses:‍

- L = 0: Very dark eclipse. Moon almost invisible, especially at mid-totality.
- L = 1: Dark eclipse, gray or brownish in coloration. Details distinguishable only with difficulty.
- L = 2: Deep red or rust-coloured eclipse. Very dark central shadow, while the outer edge of umbra is relatively bright.
- L = 3: Brick-red eclipse. Umbral shadow usually has a bright or yellow rim.
- L = 4: Very bright copper-red or orange eclipse. Umbral shadow is bluish and has a very bright rim.

== In culture ==
The symbol for a lunar eclipse (or any body in the shadow of another) is (U+1F776 🝶).

Several cultures have myths related to lunar eclipses or allude to the lunar eclipse as being a good or bad omen. The Egyptians saw the eclipse as a sow swallowing the Moon for a short time; other cultures view the eclipse as the Moon being swallowed by other animals, such as a jaguar in Mayan tradition, or a mythical three-legged toad known as Chan Chu in China [24]. Some societies thought it was a demon swallowing the moon, and that they could chase it away by throwing stones and curses at it. Ancient Greeks understood the Earth was round, citing the Earth's shadow observed during a lunar eclipse as evidence.‍ Some Hindus believe in the importance of bathing in the Ganges River following an eclipse because it will help to achieve salvation.‍

=== Inca ===
Similarly to the Mayans, the Incans believed that lunar eclipses occurred when a jaguar ate the Moon, which is why a blood moon looks red. The Incans also believed that once the jaguar finished eating the Moon, it could come down and devour all the animals on Earth, so they would take spears and shout at the Moon to keep it away.‍

=== Mesopotamians ===
The ancient Mesopotamians believed that a lunar eclipse was when the Moon was being attacked by seven demons. This attack was more than just one on the Moon, however, for the Mesopotamians linked what happened in the sky with what happened on the land, and because the king of Mesopotamia represented the land, the seven demons were thought to be also attacking the king. In order to prevent this attack on the king, the Mesopotamians made someone pretend to be the king so they would be attacked instead of the true king. After the lunar eclipse was over, the substitute king was made to disappear (possibly by poisoning).‍

=== Chinese ===
In some Chinese cultures, people would ring bells to prevent a dragon or other wild animals from biting the Moon.‍ In the 19th century, during a lunar eclipse, the Chinese Navy fired its artillery because of this belief.‍ During the Zhou dynasty (c. 1046 BC – 256 BC), according to the Book of Songs, the sight of a red moon engulfed in darkness was believed to foreshadow famine or disease.‍

Totality during the lunar eclipse of 15 May 2022. Direct sunlight is being blocked by the Earth, and the only light reaching it is sunlight refracted by Earth's atmosphere, producing a reddish color.

== Occurrence ==
In the 21st century there are 228 lunar eclipses, an average of 2.28 per year, with at least two every year. Total lunar eclipses are less common than partial lunar eclipses. Over a 5,000-year span from 2000 BCE to 3000 CE, 36.3% of lunar eclipses are penumbral, 34.9% are partial, and 28.8% are total.‍ If the date and time of an eclipse are known, the occurrence of upcoming eclipses is predictable using an eclipse cycle, like the saros. During a saros period, lasting 18 years and 11 days, there will usually be 70 eclipses, of which 29 are lunar.‍ Eclipses occur only during an eclipse season, when the Sun appears to pass near either node of the Moon's orbit.

== View from the Moon ==
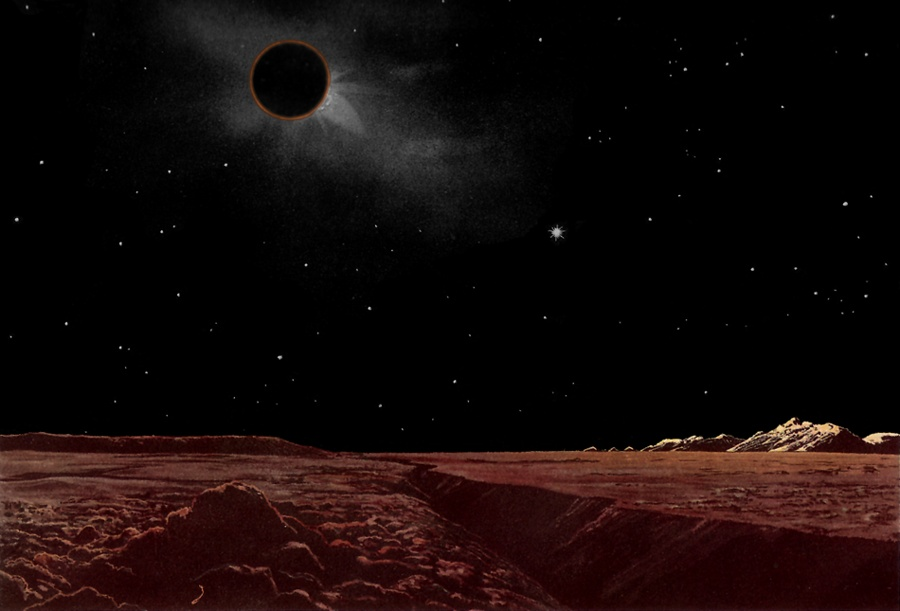
A painting by Lucien Rudaux showing how a solar eclipse might appear when viewed from the lunar surface. The Moon's surface appears red because the only sunlight available is refracted through Earth's atmosphere on the edges of Earth, as shown in the sky in this painting.

A lunar eclipse is, on the Moon, a solar eclipse; the occurrence makes Earth's atmosphere appear as a red ring around the dark Earth. One such event was captured by the Surveyor 3 camera in 1967.‍ A second event was photographed in color by the Blue Ghost Mission 1 in 2025.‍ During a full moon, the phase during which lunar eclipses take place, the dark side of the Earth is illuminated by the Moon and its moonlight.

== See also ==
- Lists of lunar eclipses and List of lunar eclipses in the 21st century
- Lunar occultation – When an astronomical object is hidden behind the Moon
- Moon illusion – Perceived variation in the Moon's size
- Orbit of the Moon – The Moon's circuit around Earth
- Solar eclipse – Event wherein the Sun is obscured by the Moon
- Eclipses in history and culture
