= False sunrise =

Atmospheric optical phenomena in which the Sun appears to have risen

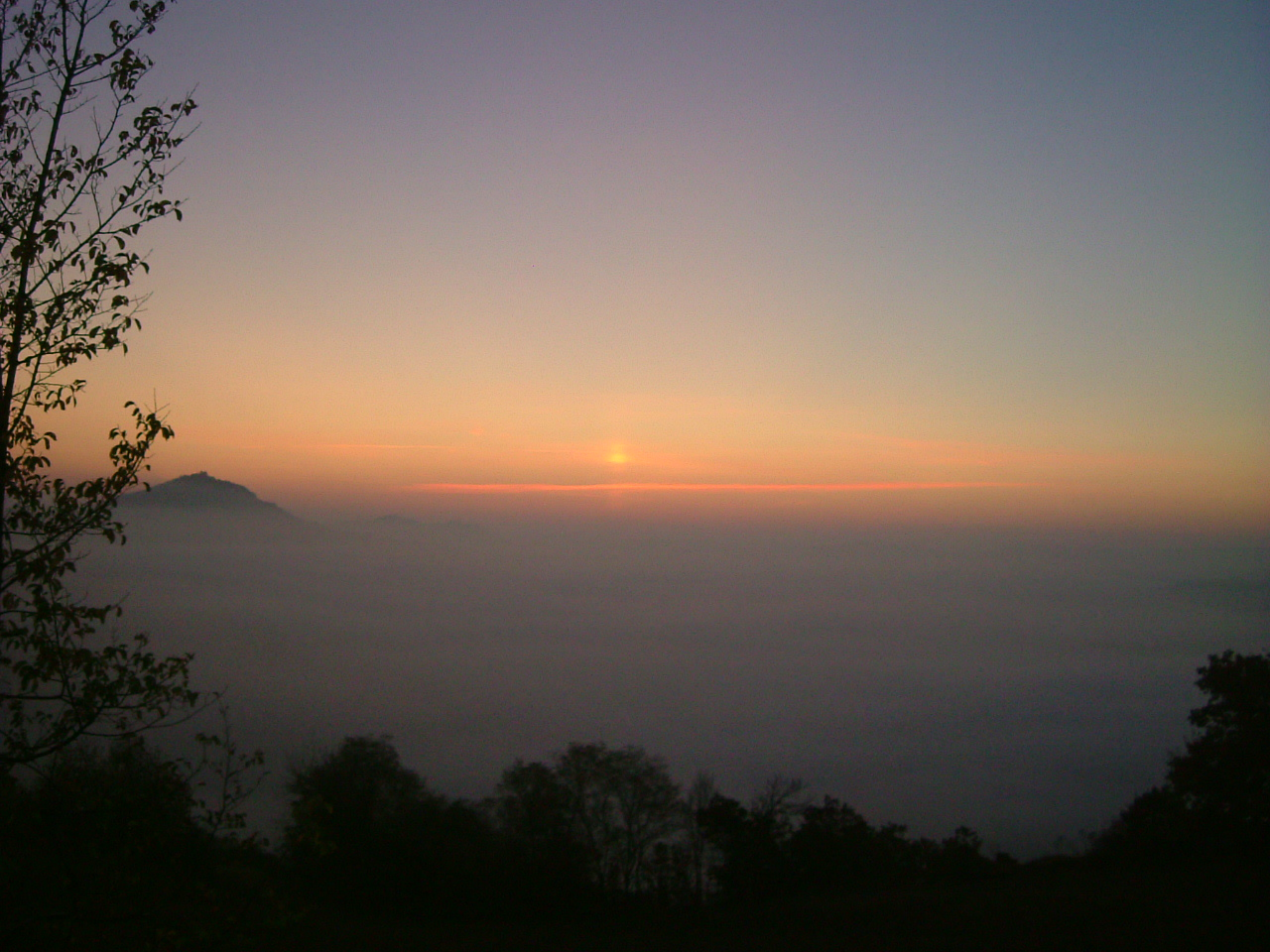
A "false sunrise" (in the form of a fragmentary upper Sun pillar) as seen on Monte Belmonte, Bologna, Italy, on October 2008. Note the "lake-reflection" effect which is not real because there is no water in between.

A false sunrise is any of several atmospheric optical phenomena in which the Sun appears to have risen, but is actually still some distance below the horizon. A number of different atmospheric conditions can be responsible for this effect, all of which divert the sunlight in such a way as to allow it to reach the observer's eye, thereby giving the impression that the light comes directly from the Sun itself. The spread of light can sometimes resemble that of the true sun.

Several atmospheric phenomena that may alternatively be called a "false sunrise" are:

- Simple reflection of the sunlight off the bottom of the clouds.
- A type of ice crystal halo, such as an upper tangent arc or, more commonly, an upper sun pillar (similar to a subsun, but extending above the sun instead of below it). Like all halos, these phenomena are caused by the reflection and/or refraction of sunlight by ice crystals suspended in the atmosphere, often in the form of cirrus or cirrostratus clouds. The temperature on the ground is irrelevant to their occurrence, meaning that halos can be seen throughout the year and in all climates.
- A type of mirage, specifically the Novaya Zemlya effect. Restricted mainly to the polar regions, this phenomenon was named after its first observation on Novaya Zemlya during the third polar expedition led by Willem Barentsz in 1596/97, when the Sun was seen above the horizon "in his full roundness" two weeks before its predicted return after the polar night. The account, written by officer Gerrit de Veer, was met with general skepticism for centuries, and not until modern times was the effect proven to be genuine.

The term "false sunrise" should not be confused with "false dawn", which is a term sometimes used to refer to the zodiacal light.

== See also ==
- False sunset
- Halo (optical phenomenon)
- Mirage
- Novaya Zemlya effect
- Subsun
- Sun pillar
- Upper tangent arc
- Zodiacal light
