= Crown flash =

Weather phenomenon producing light

Crown flash is a rarely observed meteorological phenomenon caused by the effect of atmospheric electrical fluctuations on the alignment of ice crystals. It has been described as "the brightening of a thunderhead crown followed by the appearance of aurora-like streamers emanating into the clear atmosphere". The current hypothesis for why the phenomenon occurs is that sunlight is reflecting off, or refracting through, tiny ice crystals above the crown of a cumulonimbus cloud. These ice crystals are aligned by the strong electric field effects around the cloud, so the effect may appear as a tall (sometimes curved) streamer, pillar of light, or resemble a massive flash of a searchlight/flashlight beam. When the electric field is disturbed by electrical charging or discharging (typically, from lightning) within the cloud, the ice crystals are re-oriented causing the light pattern to shift in a characteristic manner, at times very rapidly and appearing to 'dance' in a strikingly mechanical fashion. The effect may also sometimes be known as a "leaping sundog" or "jumping sundog". As with sundogs, observation of the effect is dependent upon the observer's position – it is not a self-generated light such as seen in a lightning strike or aurora, but rather a changing reflection or refraction of the sunlight. Unlike sundogs, however (which are also caused by refraction of sunlight through ice crystals), these features move and realign within seconds, forming beams and loops of light, and the effect appears localised directly above the cloud rather than at some distance to the side(s) of the sun.

The first scientific description of the crown flash phenomenon appears to be in the journal Monthly Weather Review in 1885, according to the Guinness Book of Records. Also mentioned in Nature in 1971 and in a letter to Nature slightly earlier in the same year, this phenomenon is regarded as uncommon and not well documented. Starting with an initial video upload in 2009 dozens of YouTube videos have since been emerging that appear to document this phenomenon.

== See also ==
- Light pillar
- Sun dog
- Subsun
