= Light pillar =

Reflections of a light source created by ice crystals in the air

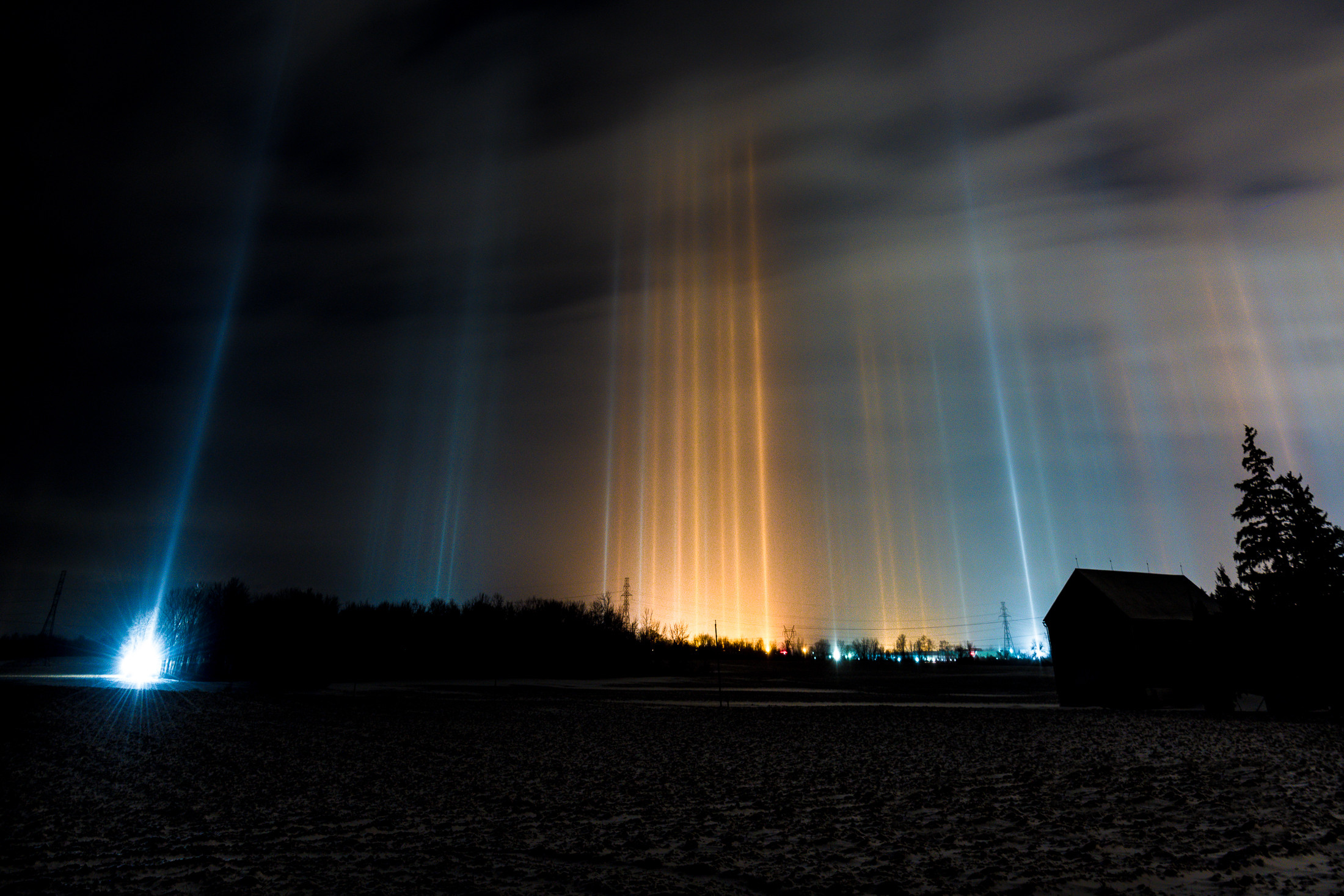
Light pillars in London, Ontario, Canada

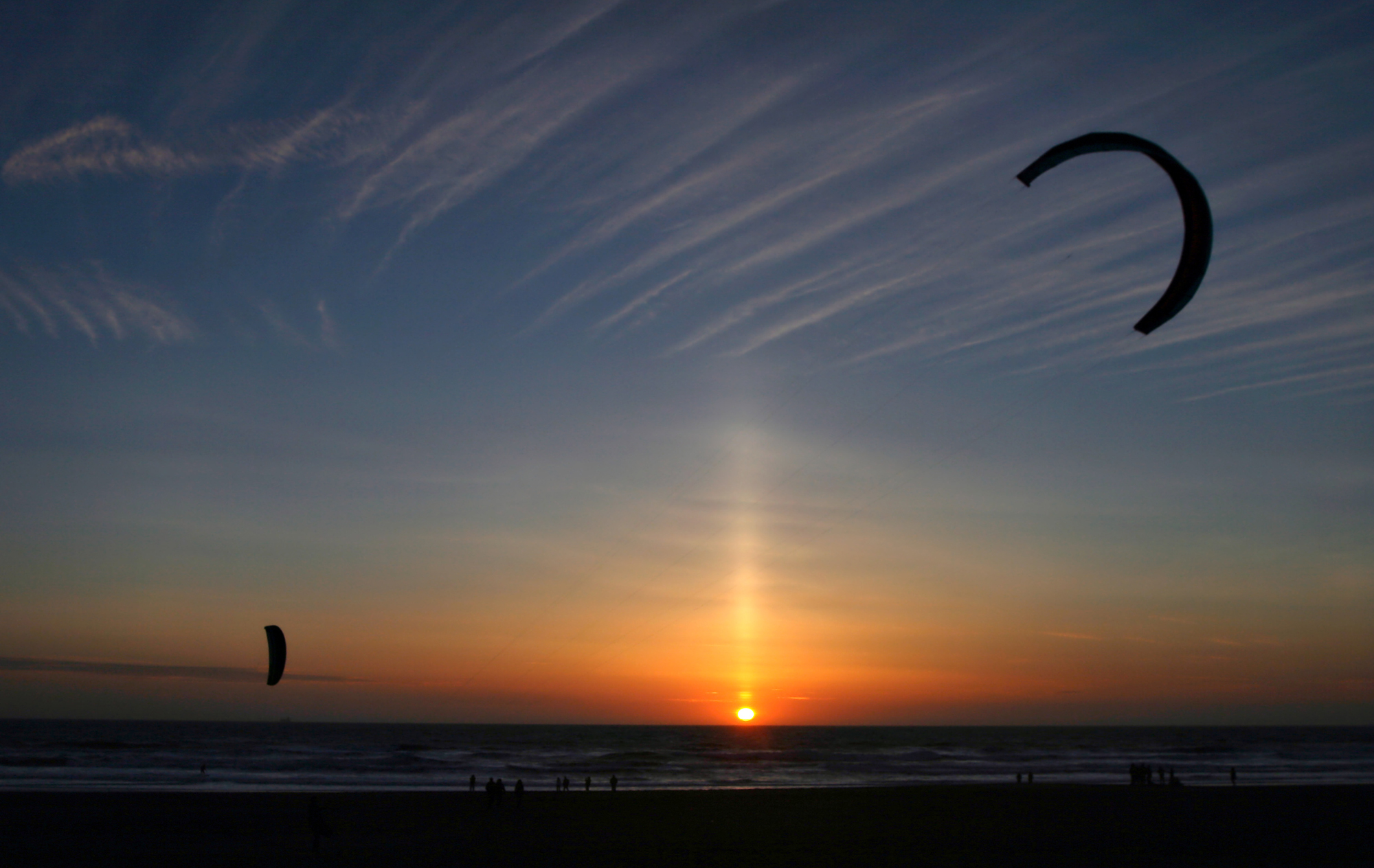
Sun pillar in San Francisco, California

A light pillar or ice pillar is an atmospheric optical phenomenon in which a vertical beam of light appears to extend above and/or below a light source. The effect is created by the reflection of light from tiny ice crystals that are suspended in the atmosphere or that compose high-altitude clouds (e.g. cirrostratus or cirrus clouds). If the light comes from the Sun (usually when it is near or even below the horizon), the phenomenon is called a sun pillar or solar pillar. Light pillars can also be caused by the Moon or terrestrial sources, such as streetlights and erupting volcanoes.

== Formation ==
Scheme of light pillars formation

Due to the fact they are caused by the interaction of light with ice crystals, light pillars belong to the family of halos. The crystals responsible for light pillars usually consist of flat, hexagonal plates, which tend to orient themselves more or less horizontally as they fall through the air. Each flake acts as a mirror which reflects light sources that are appropriately positioned below it (see image), and the presence of flakes at a spread of altitudes causes the reflection to be elongated vertically into a column. The larger and more numerous the crystals, the more pronounced this effect becomes. More rarely, column-shaped crystals can cause light pillars as well. In very cold weather, the ice crystals can be suspended near the ground, in which case they are referred to as diamond dust.

Unlike a light beam, a light pillar is not physically located above or below the light source. Its appearance as a vertical line is an optical illusion, resulting from the collective reflection off the ice crystals; but only those that are in the common vertical plane, direct the light rays towards the observer (See image). This is similar to viewing a light source on a body of water. Ripples on the surface of the water reflect the light source in many directions, and those that happen to be aimed at the viewer, combine to form a bright line pointing toward the light source.

== See also ==
- Crepuscular rays
- Diamond dust
- Halo
- Light beam
- Sun dog
- Crown flash
- False sunrise
- False sunset
