= Novaya Zemlya effect =

Atmospheric optical phenomenon

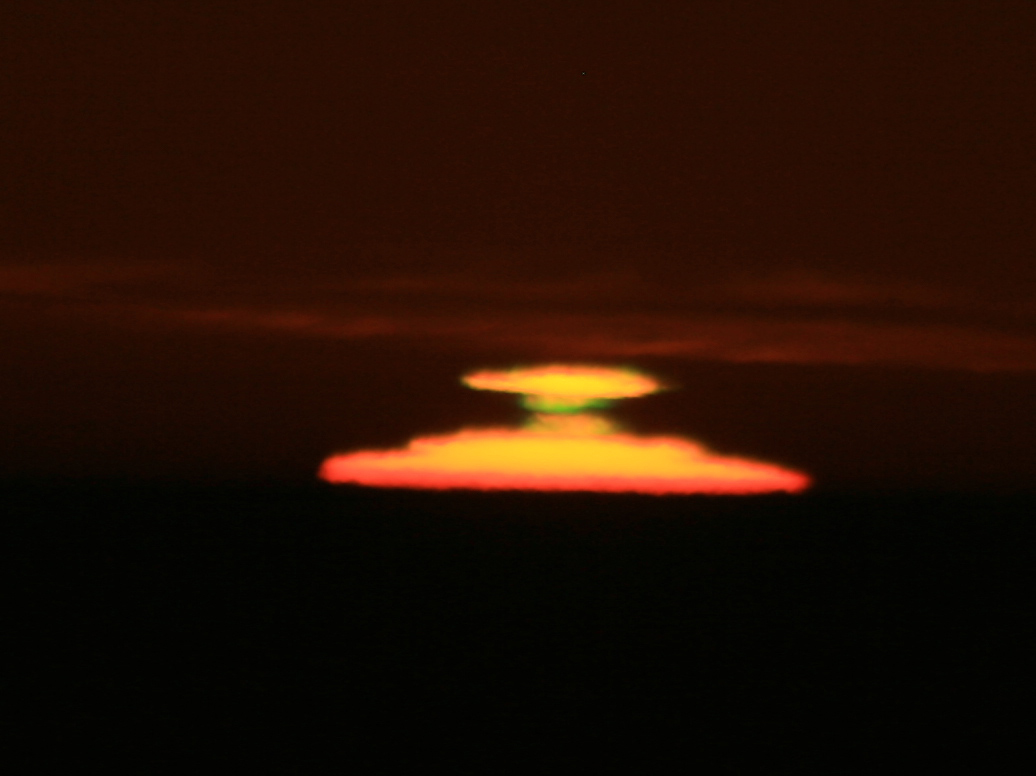
Distorted image due to the mirage. Note that this photo, which includes a green flash, was taken in San Francisco, Calif.

The Novaya Zemlya effect is a polar mirage caused by high refraction of sunlight between atmospheric thermal layers. The effect gives the impression that the sun is rising earlier than it actually should, and depending on the meteorological situation, the effect will present the Sun as a line or a square—sometimes referred to as the rectangular sun—made up of flattened hourglass shapes.

The mirage requires rays of sunlight to travel through an inversion layer for hundreds of kilometres, and depends on the inversion layer's temperature gradient. The sunlight must bend to the Earth's curvature at least 400 kilometres (250 mi) to allow an elevation rise of 5° for sight of the solar disk.

The first person to record the phenomenon was Gerrit de Veer, a member of Willem Barentsz's ill-fated third expedition into the north polar region in 1596–1597. Trapped by the ice, the party was forced to stay for the winter in a makeshift lodge on the archipelago of Novaya Zemlya and endure the polar night.

On 24 January 1597, De Veer and another crew member claimed to have seen the Sun appear above the horizon, approximately two weeks prior to its calculated return. They were met with disbelief by the rest of the crew—who accused De Veer of having used the old Julian calendar instead of the Gregorian calendar introduced several years earlier—but on 27 January, the Sun was seen by all "in his full roundnesse". For centuries the account was the source of skepticism, until in the 20th century the phenomenon was finally proven to be genuine.

Apart from the image of the Sun, the effect can also elevate the image of other objects above the horizon, such as coastlines which are normally invisible due to their distance. After studying the Saga of Erik the Red, Waldemar Lehn concluded that the effect may have aided the Vikings in their discovery of Iceland and Greenland, which are not visible from the mainland under normal atmospheric conditions.

== See also ==
- Looming and similar refraction phenomena
- Mirage of astronomical objects
- Fata Morgana (mirage)
