= Tangent arc =

Atmospheric optical phemonenon

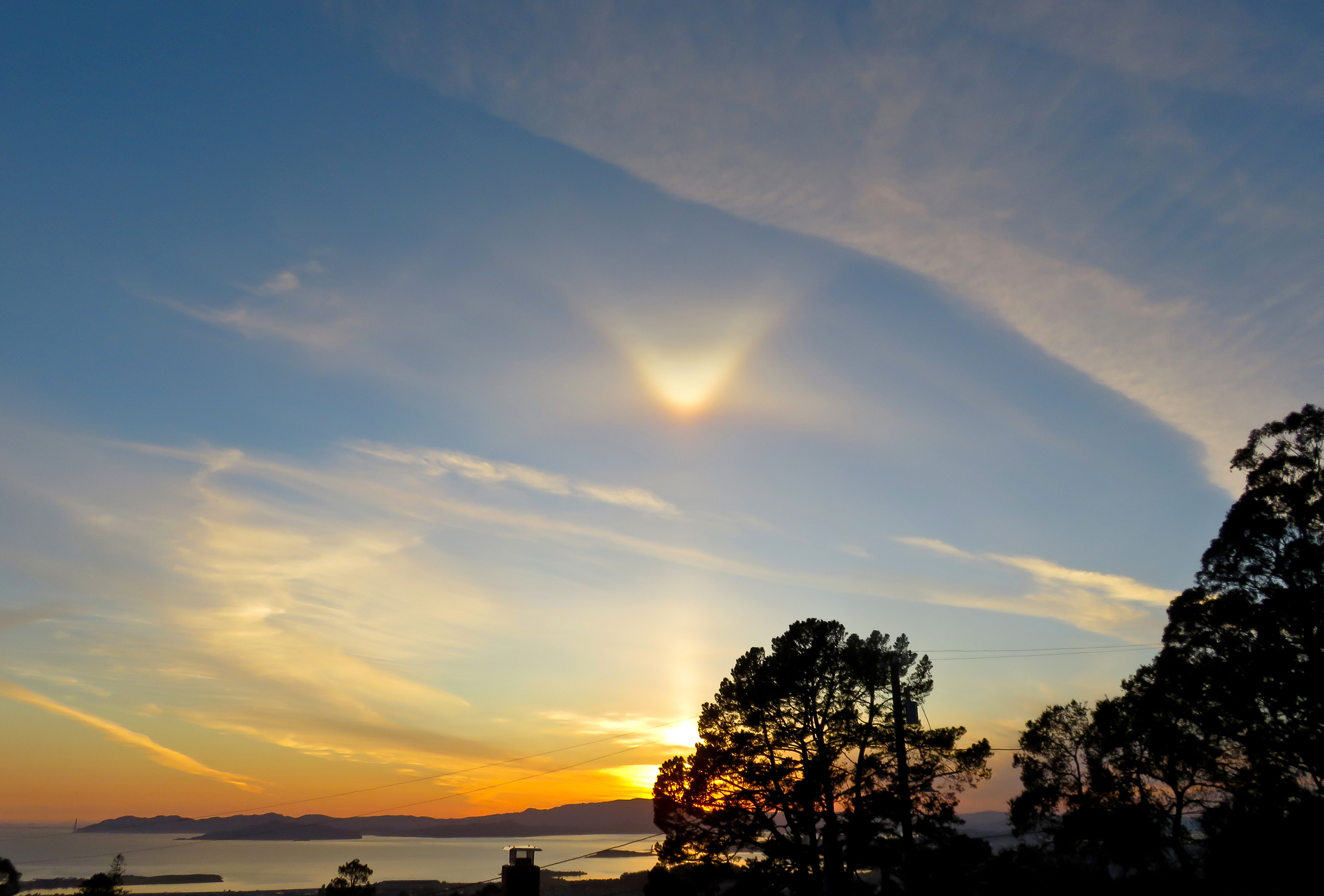
An upper tangent arc appearing above San Francisco Bay and Marin County in California, at sunset on April 9, 2023.

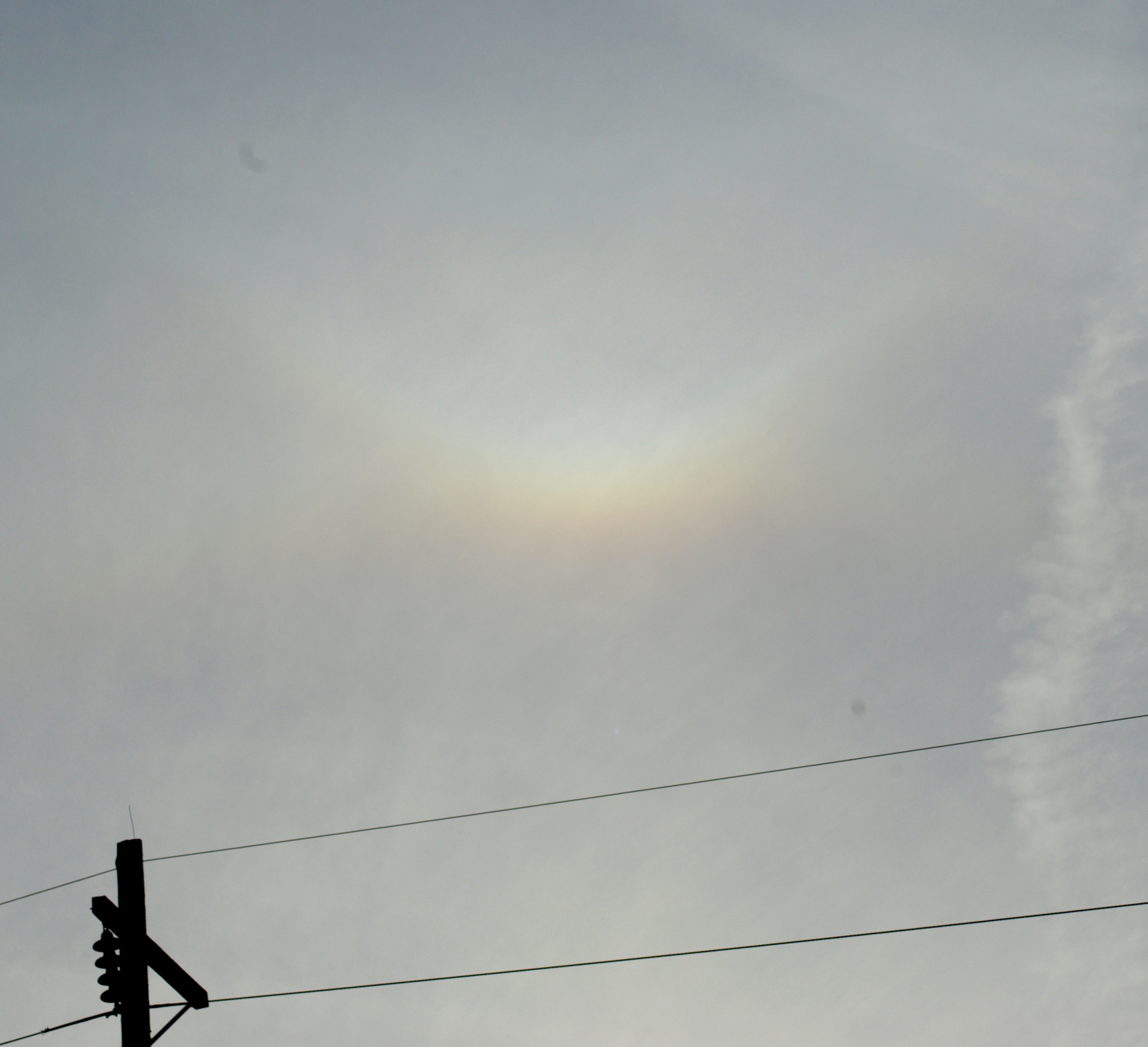
An upper tangent arc with the Sun at an observed low altitude.

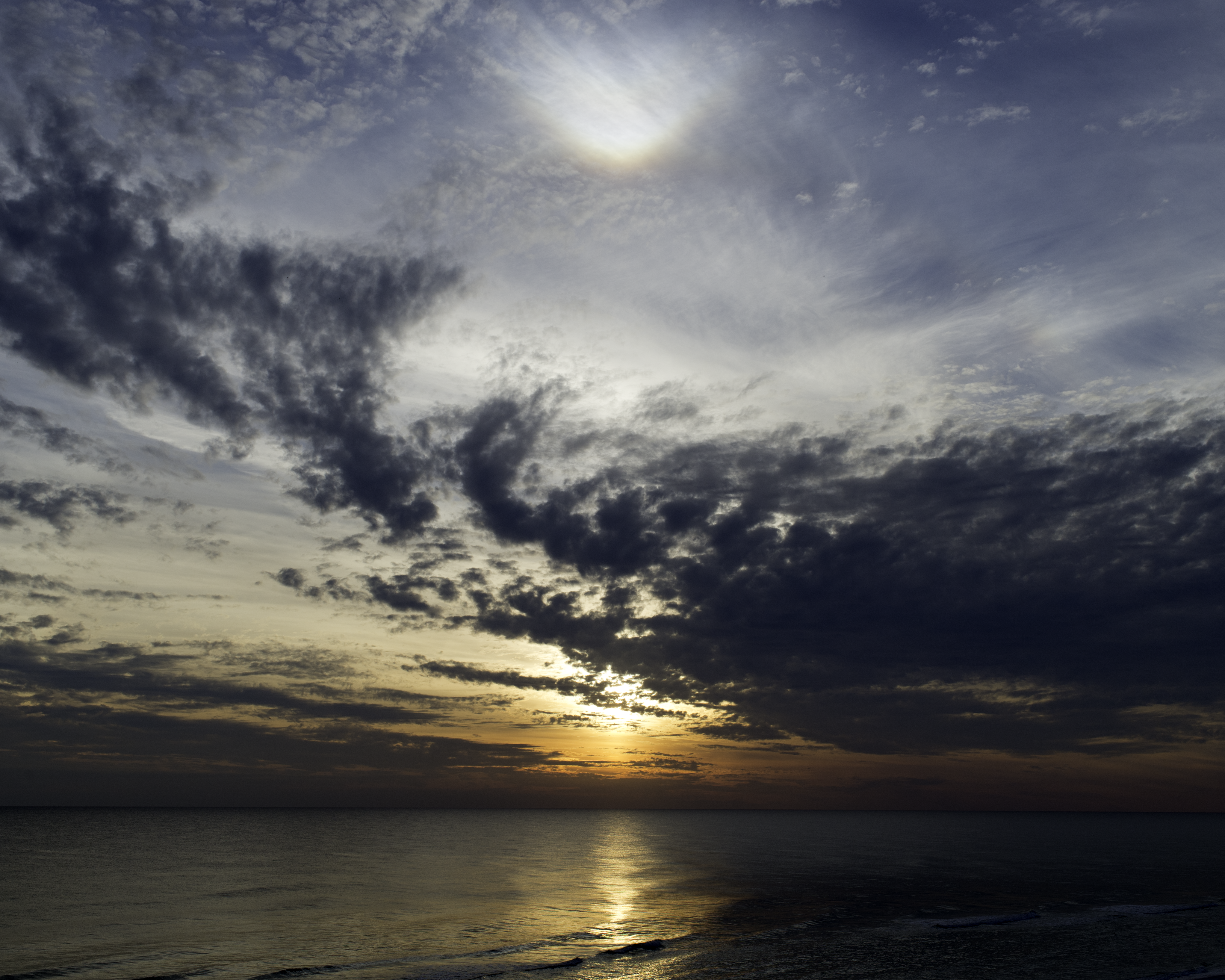
An upper tangent arc seen over the setting Sun at Santa Rosa Beach, Florida.

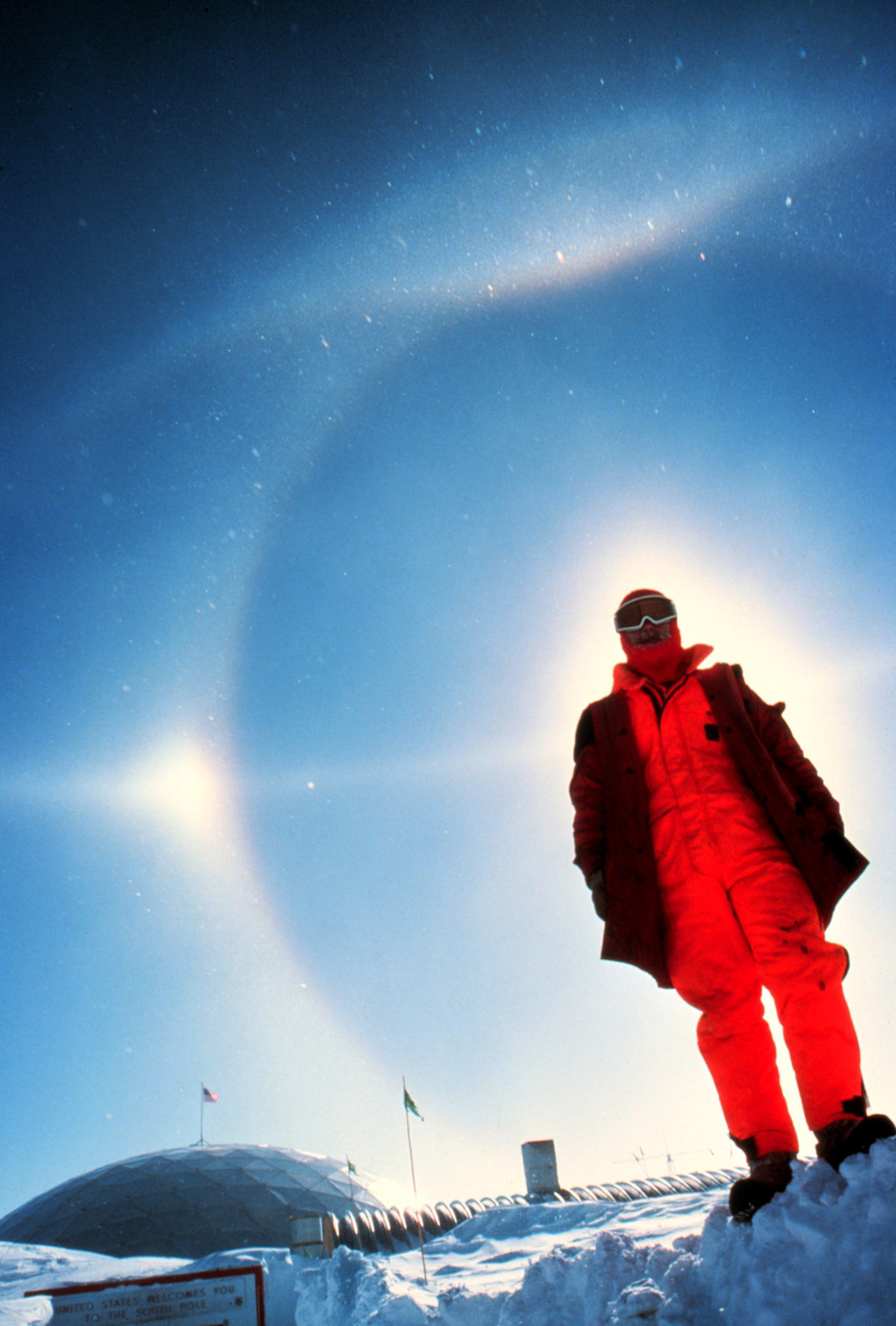
A halo display observed over the South Pole. Featured in the photo are several distinct phenomena: A parhelic circle (horizontal line), a 22° halo (circle) with a sundog (bright spot), and an upper tangent arc. Photo: Cindy McFee, NOAA, December 1980.

Tangent arcs are a type of halo, an atmospheric optical phenomenon, which appears above and below the observed Sun or Moon, tangent to the 22° halo. To produce these arcs, rod-shaped hexagonal ice crystals need to have their long axis aligned horizontally.

== Description ==
=== Upper arc ===
The shape of an upper tangent arc varies with the elevation of the Sun; while the Sun is low (less than 29–32°) it appears as an arc over the observed Sun forming a sharp angle. As the Sun is seen to rise above the Earth's horizon, the curved wings of the arc lower towards the 22° halo while gradually becoming longer. As the Sun rises over 29–32°, the upper tangent arc unites with the lower tangent arc to form the circumscribed halo.

=== Lower arc ===
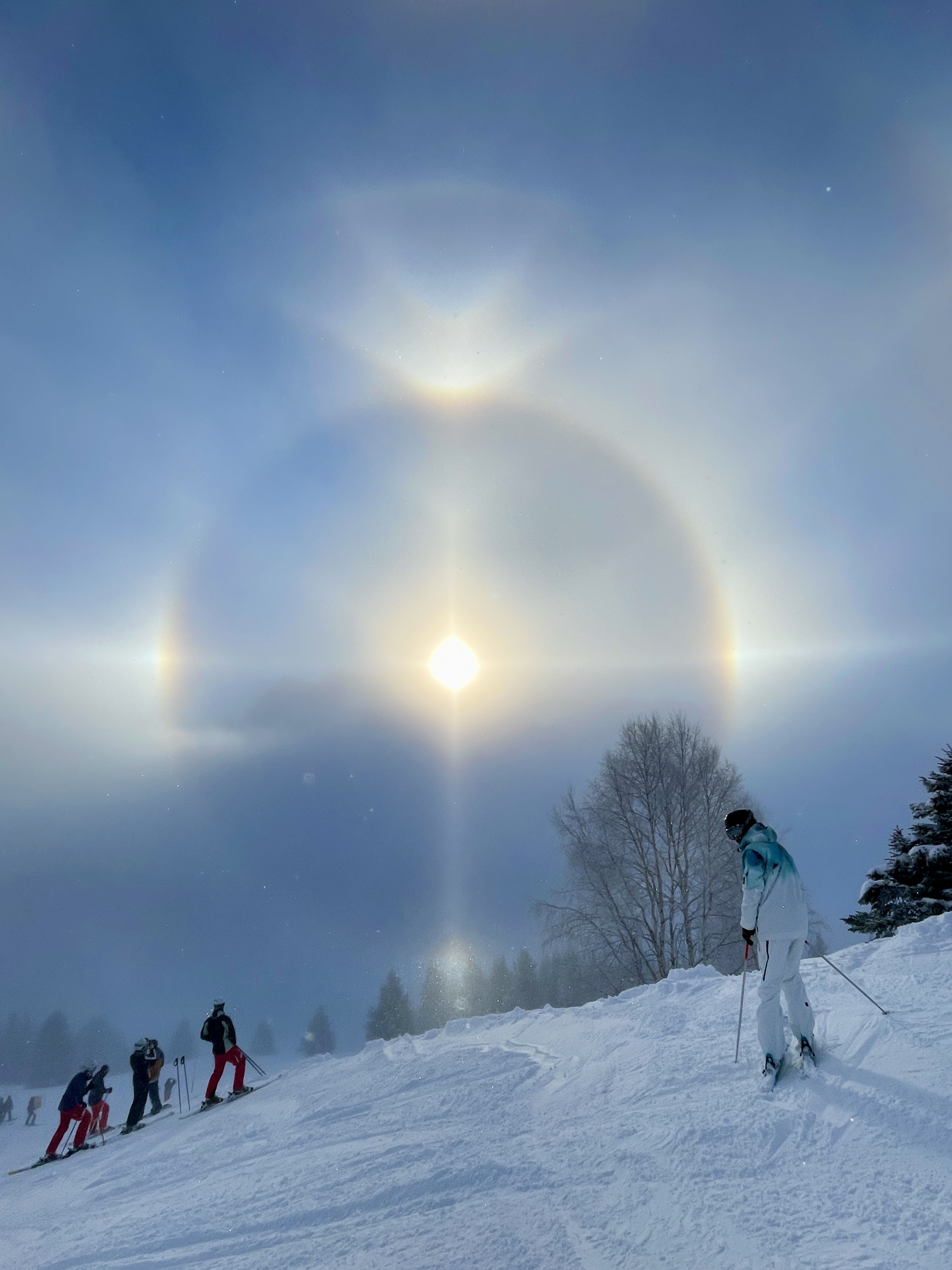
A 22° halo featuring two sun dogs on both sides, as well as an upper and a lower tangent arcs at the top and the bottom.

The lower tangent arc is rarely observable, appearing under and tangent to a 22° halo centred on the Sun. Just like upper tangent arcs, the shape of a lower arc is dependent on the altitude of the Sun. As the Sun is observed slipping over Earth's horizon the lower tangent arc forms a sharp, wing-shaped angle below the Sun. As the Sun rises over Earth's horizon, the arc first folds upon itself and then takes the shape of a wide arc. As the Sun reaches 29-32° over the horizon, it finally begins to widen and merge with the upper tangent arc to form the circumscribed halo.

Since by definition, the Sun elevation must exceed 22° above the horizon, most observations are from elevated observation points such as mountains and planes.

== Origin ==
Both the upper and lower tangent arc form when hexagonal rod-shaped ice crystals in cirrus clouds have their long axis oriented horizontally. Each crystal can have its long axis oriented in a different horizontal direction, and can rotate around the long axis. Such a crystal configuration also produces other halos, including 22° halos and sun dogs; a predominant horizontal orientation is required to produce a crisp upper tangent arc. Like all colored halos, tangent arcs grade from red towards the Sun (i.e., downwards) to blue away from it, because red light is refracted less strongly than blue light.

== See also ==
- Circumhorizontal arc
- Circumzenithal arc
- Kern arc
- Subsun
