= Subsun =

Glowing spot that can be seen within clouds or haze when observed from above

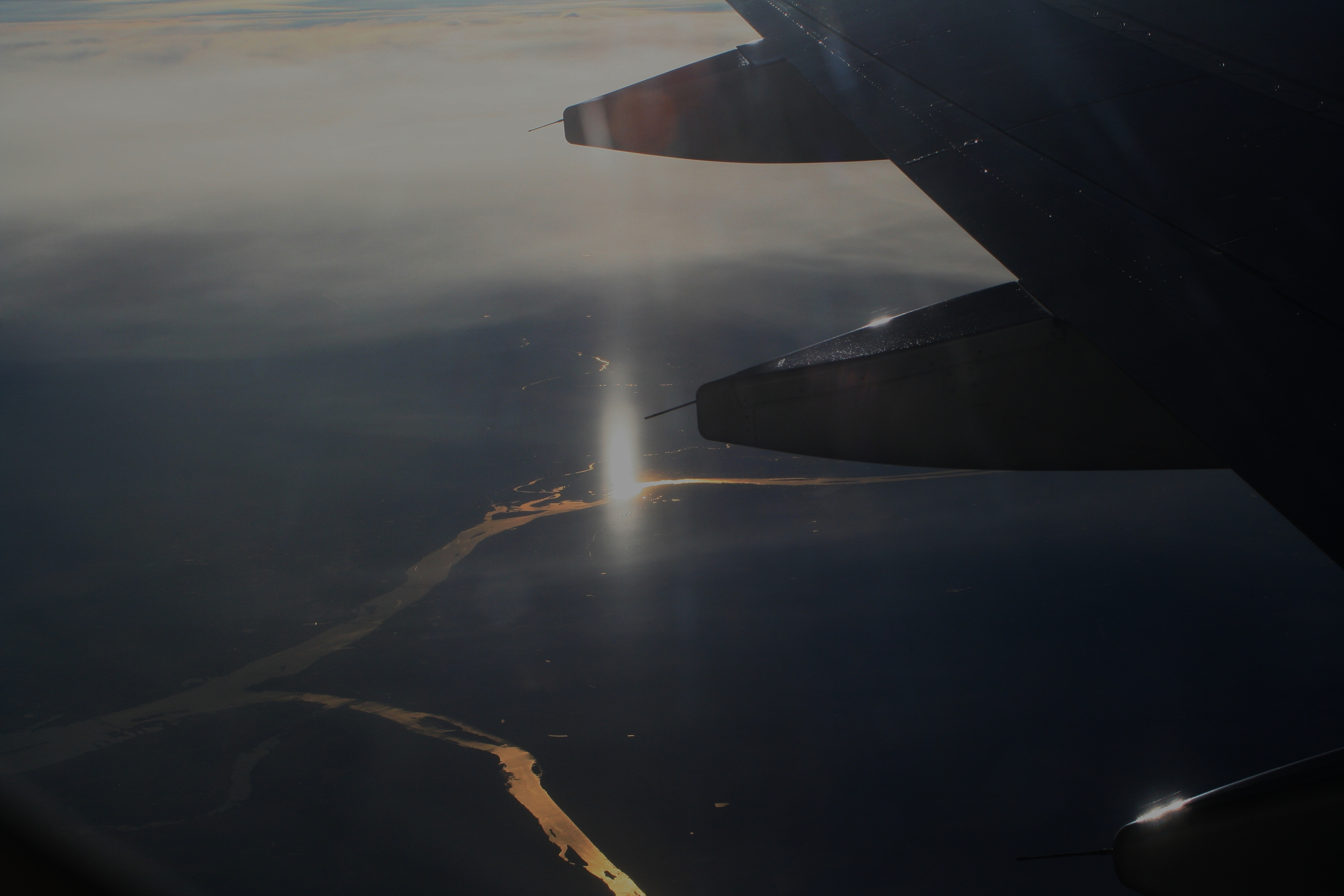
A subsun seen from an airplane

A subsun (also spelled sub-sun) is an optical phenomenon that appears as a glowing spot visible within clouds or mist when observed from above. The subsun appears directly below the actual Sun, and is caused by sunlight reflecting off numerous tiny ice crystals suspended in the atmosphere. As such, the effect belongs to the family of halos. It is also known as a "sun candle".

== Formation ==
The subsun phenomenon appears when a region of hexagonal ice crystals act as a large mirror, creating a virtual image of the Sun below the horizon. As they fall through the air, the ice forms plate crystals which orient horizontally, i.e., with their hexagonal surfaces parallel to the Earth's surface. When they are disturbed by turbulence, the plates "wobble", causing their surfaces to deviate some degrees from the ideal horizontal orientation, and causing the reflection (i.e., the subsun) to become elongated vertically.

== Deformations ==
When the subsun is stretched far enough vertically, it can become a vertical column known as a lower sun pillar. A sun pillar is a form of light pillar.

== Examples (Images) ==
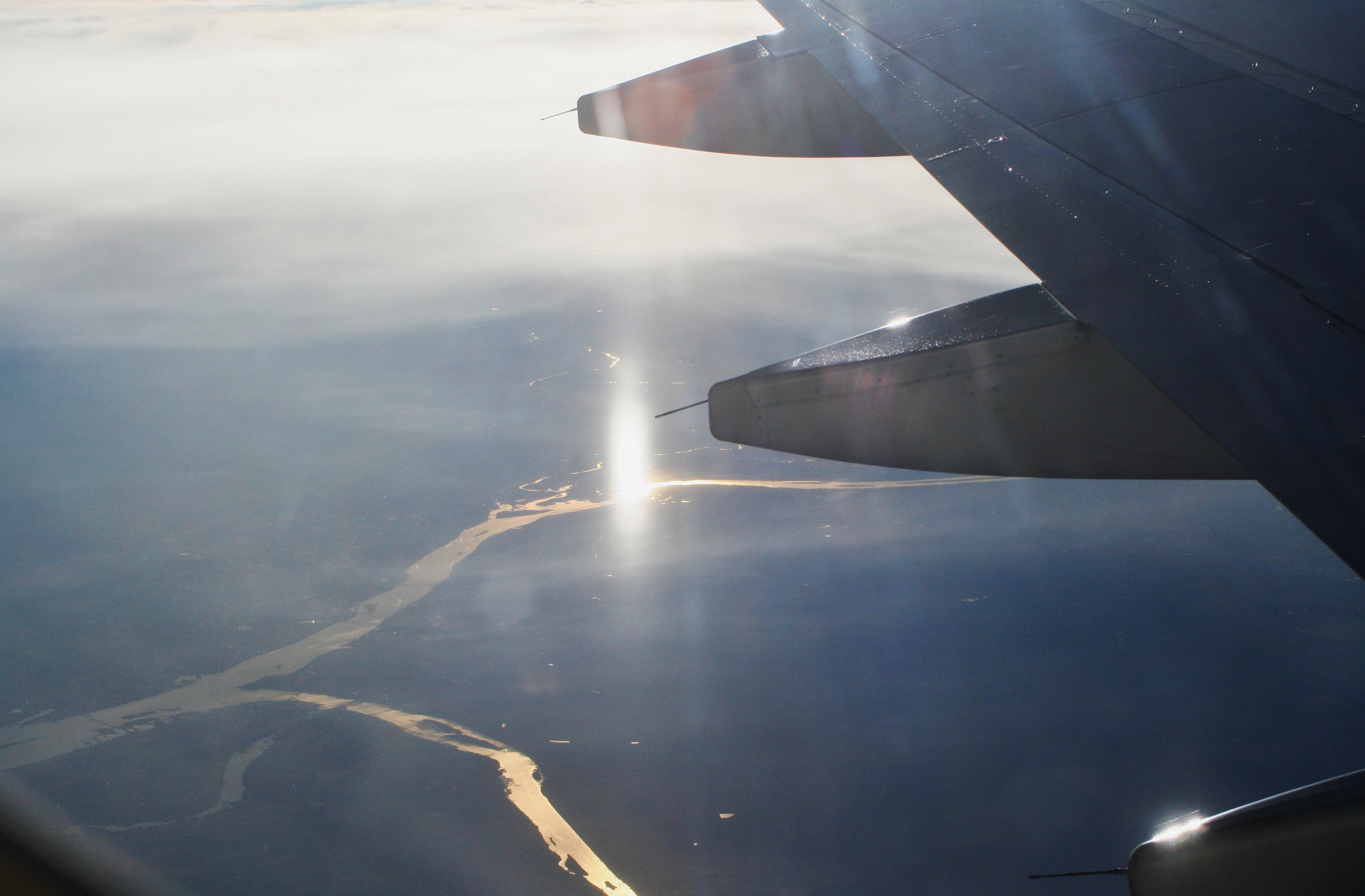
A vertically stretched subsun, seen from an airplane

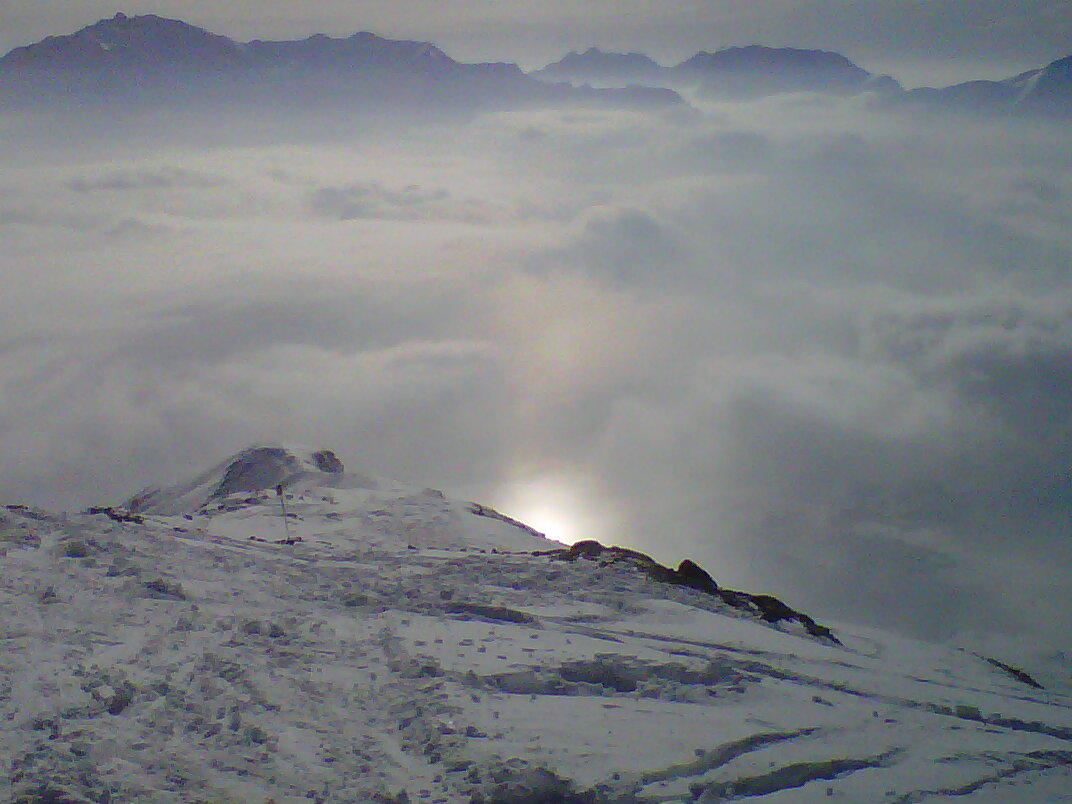
A rounder subsun, partially obstructed by a gradual mountain peak

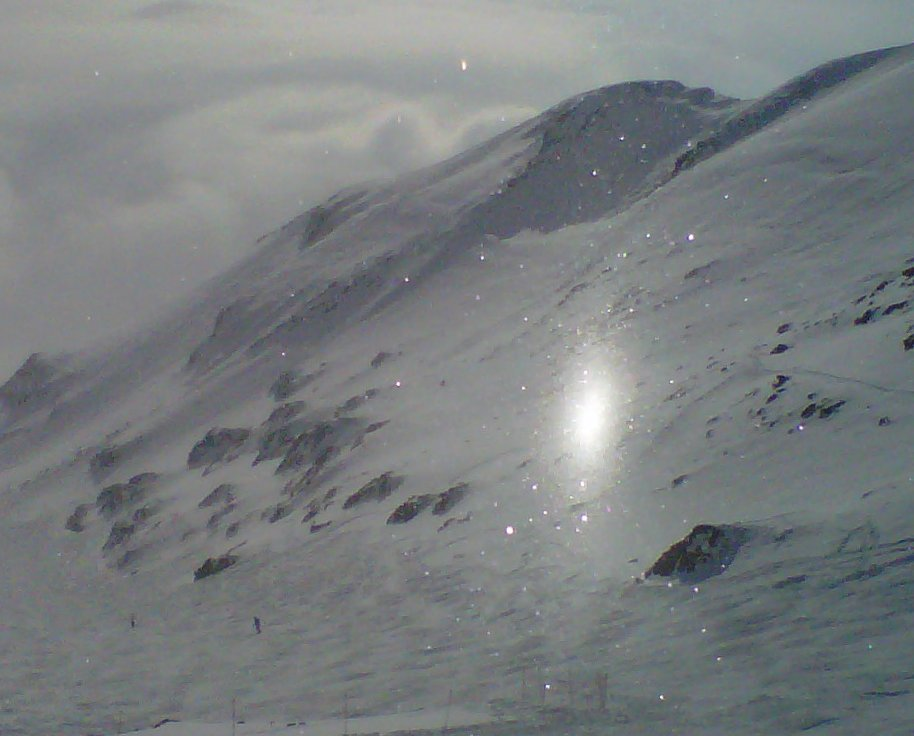
A more vertically elongated subsun before a gentle, snow-covered cliff

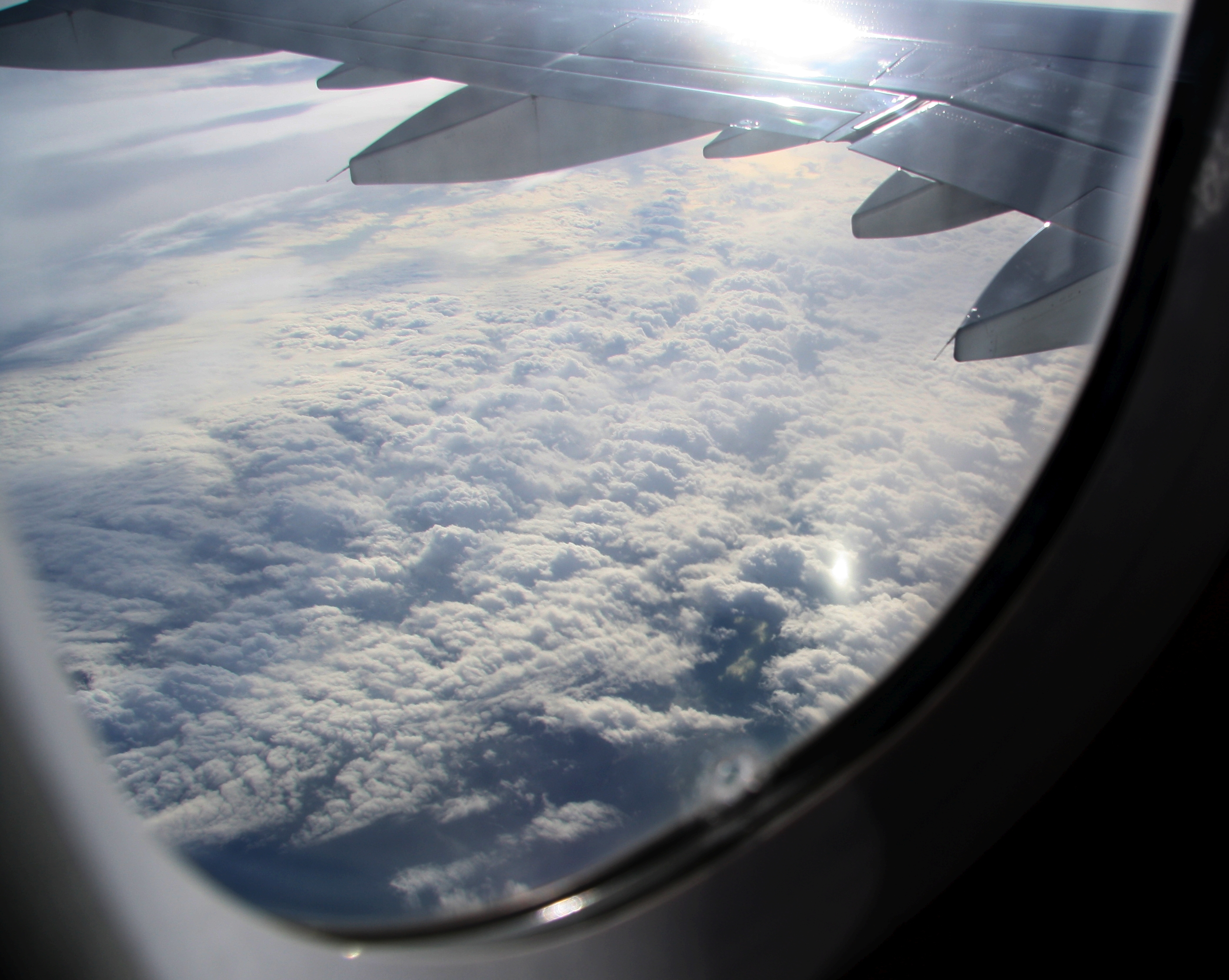
Seen to the bottom right is a plump, oval-shaped subsun, tiny in composition.

== See also ==
- Crown flash
- Sun dog
- Halo
- Light pillar
