= Crepuscular rays =

Sunbeams that originate when the Sun appears to be just below the horizon

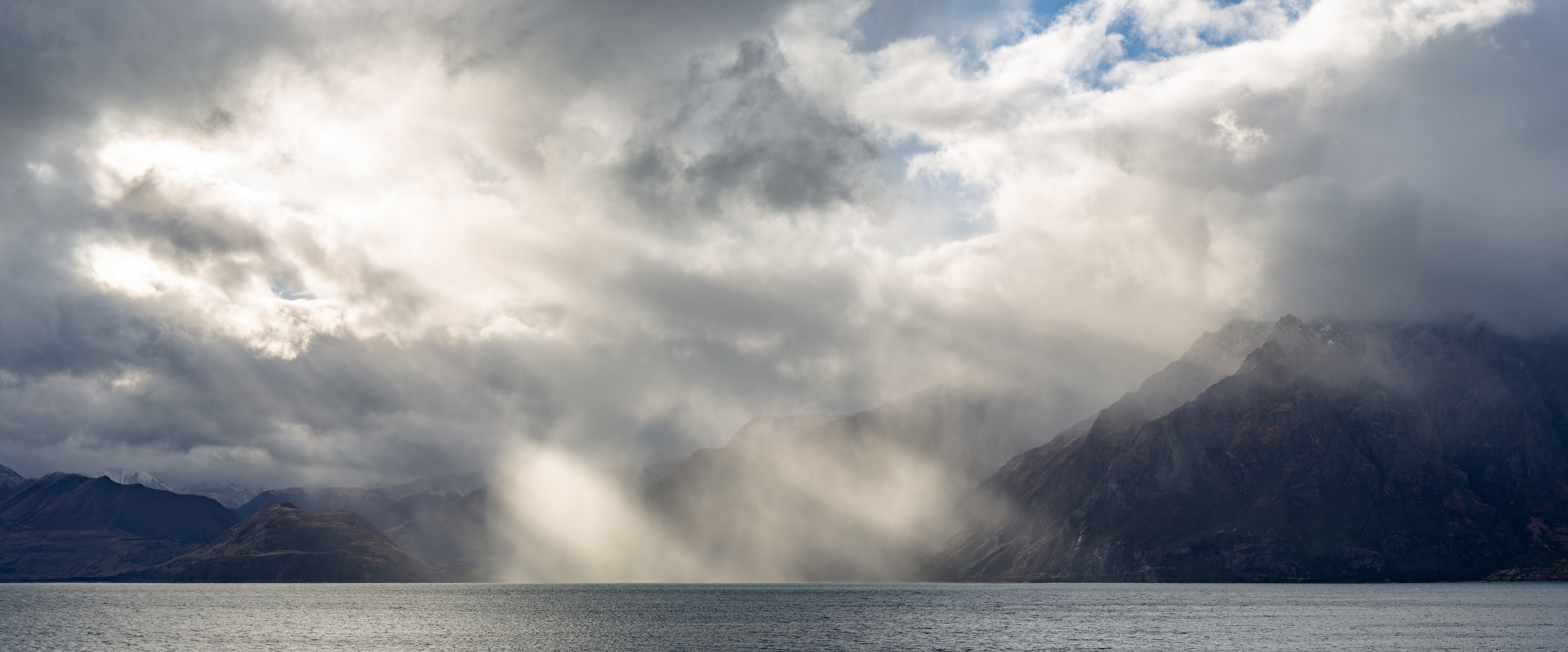
Sunlight shining through clouds, giving rise to crepuscular rays over Lake Hāwea, New Zealand

Crepuscular rays, sometimes colloquially known as god rays, twilight rays, or Jacob's ladder, are visible shafts of sunlight that originate when the Sun appears to be just above or below a layer of clouds, during the twilight period. Crepuscular rays are often observed as visible light beams passing through gaps in clouds, and are especially prominent when the contrast between light and dark is most obvious. The term "crepuscular" comes from the Latin word crepusculum, meaning "twilight".

During twilight, Crepuscular rays can commonly exhibit an orange or reddish coloration. This is due to the Rayleigh scattering phenomenon, in which as light travels through the atmosphere, it encounters particles and gases which scatters short-wavelength (blue) light more strongly than longer wavelengths (orange and red). During dawn and dusk, sunlight travels at low solar angles and through a greater thickness of the atmosphere - about 40 times more air than when the Sun is overhead at midday - resulting in a more pronounced warm colouration in sunbeams.

Crepuscular rays are in fact almost parallel to one another; however they appear to radiate outwards, due to a perspective effect, similar to how parallel lines of a long road appear to meet in the distance. Loosely, the term crepuscular rays is sometimes extended to the general phenomenon of rays of sunlight that appear to converge at a point in the sky, irrespective of time of day.

A rare related phenomenon are anticrepuscular rays which can appear at the same time (and coloration) as crepuscular rays but in the opposite direction to the setting sun (east rather than west).

== Gallery ==
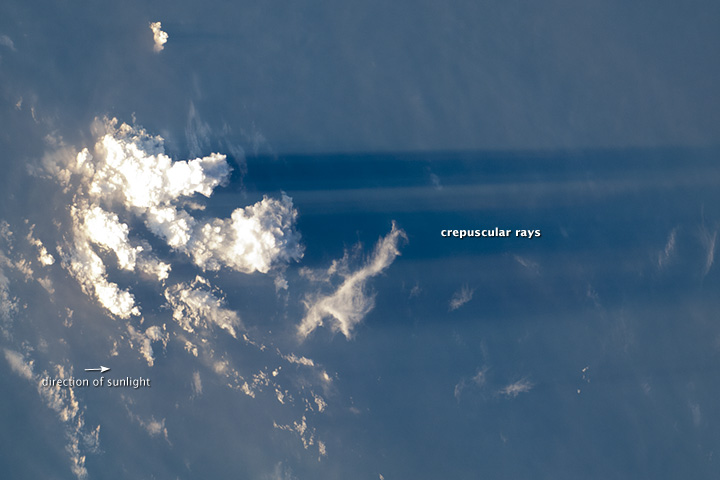
Orbital view of crepuscular rays

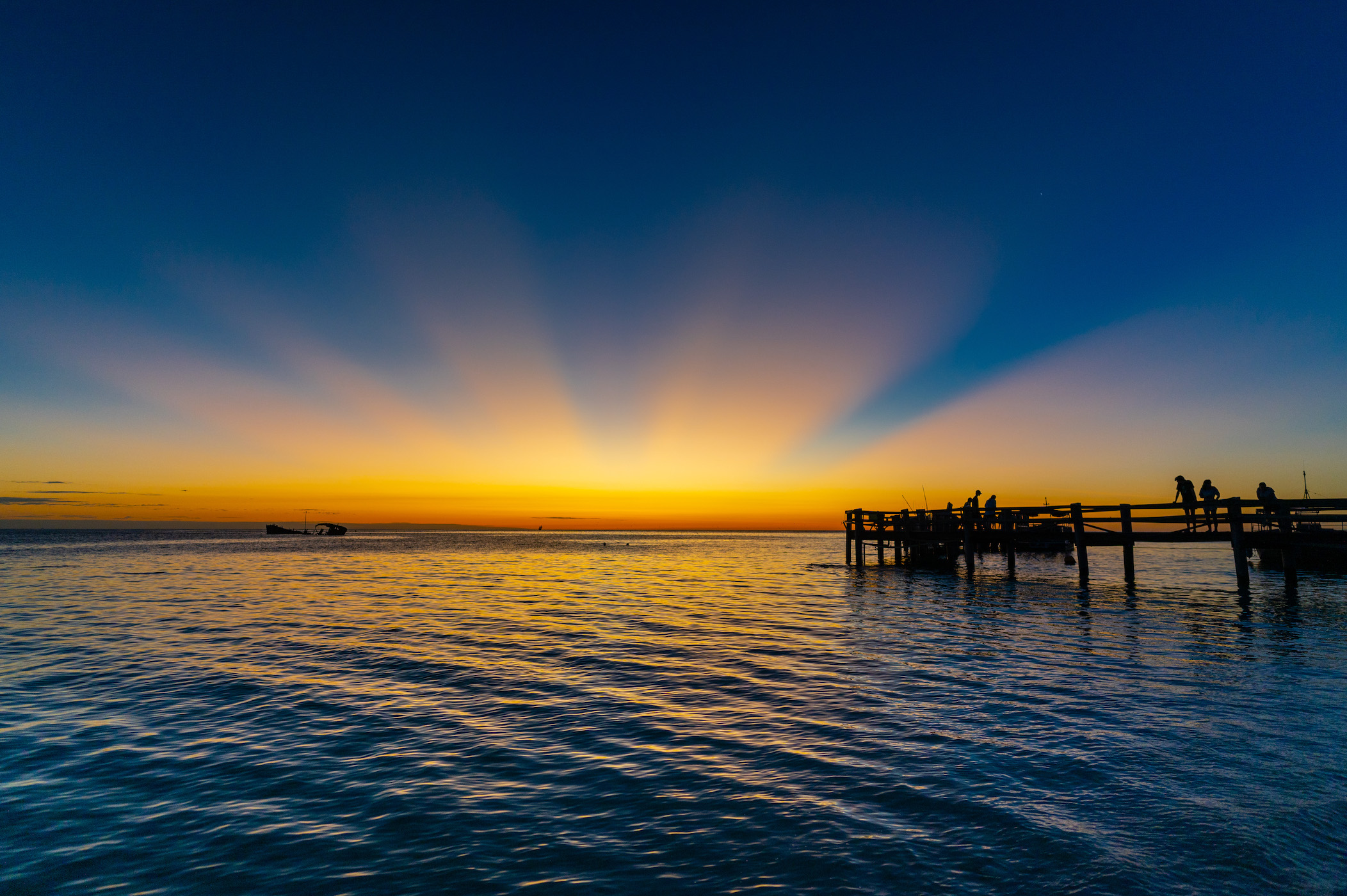
Sunset at Heron Island, Queensland, Australia (April 2023)

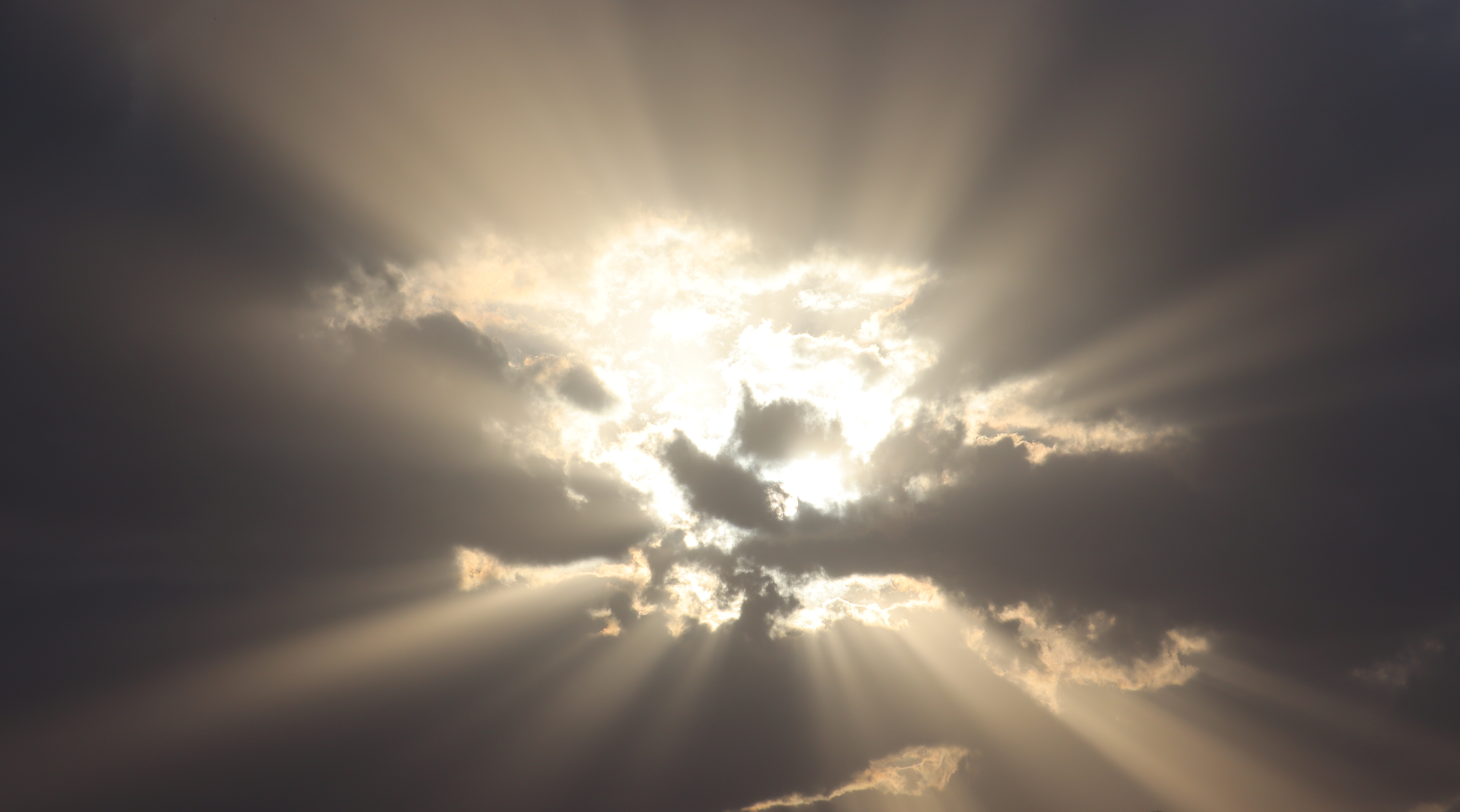
Crepuscular rays before sunset, Tikveš

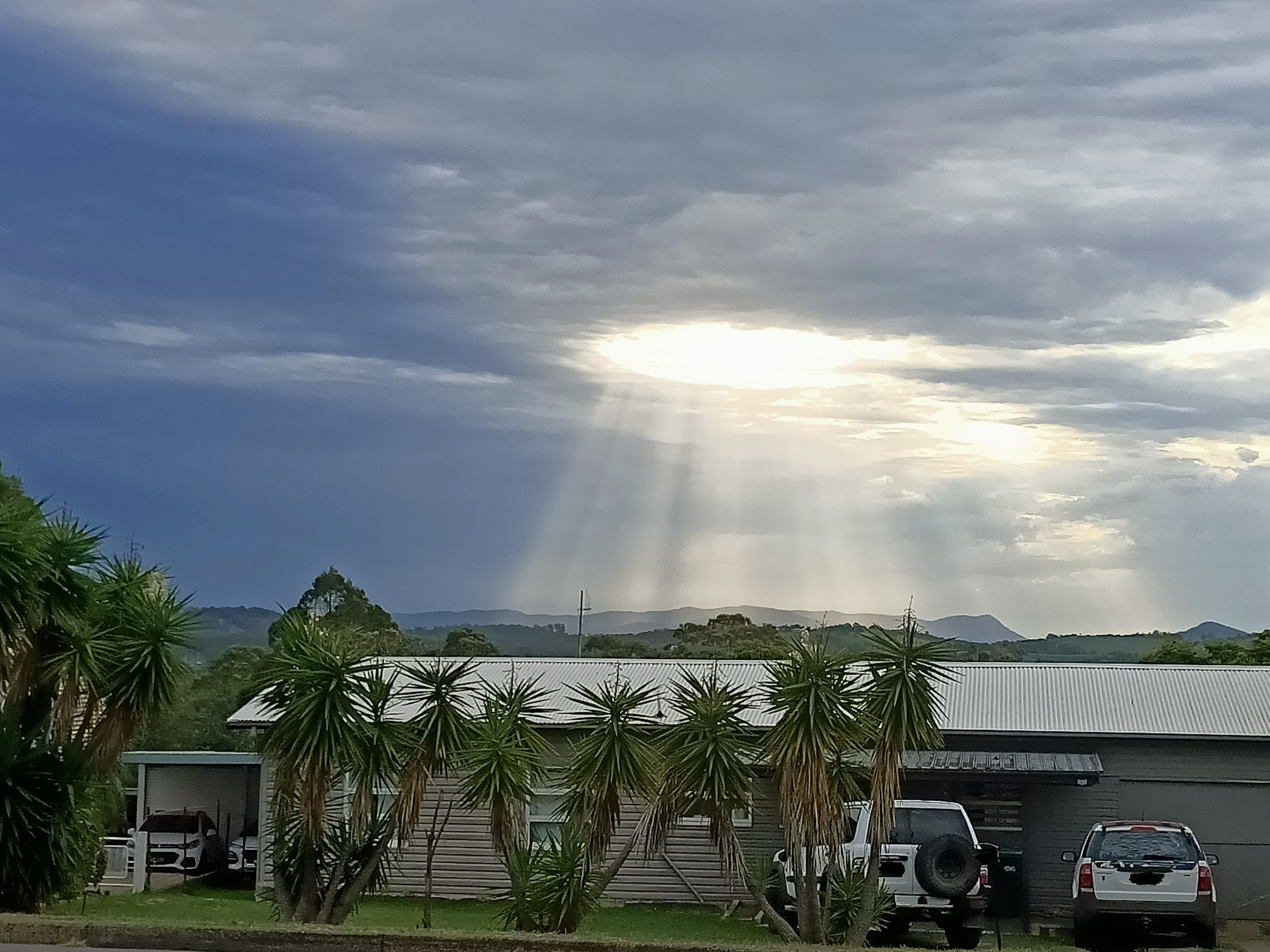
Crepuscular rays through dark rain clouds over suburban New South Wales, Australia

== See also ==
- Caustic (optics) – Envelope of light rays reflected or refracted by a curved surface/object
- Earth's shadow – Shadow that Earth casts through its atmosphere and into outer space
- Foreglow – Whitish or rosy light during twilight or after sunset
- Jacob's ladder – Ladder in Genesis joining Earth to heaven
- Mie scattering – Scattering of an electromagnetic plane wave by a sphere
- Tyndall effect – Scattering of light by tiny particles in a colloidal suspension
