= Ice crystal =

Water ice in symmetrical shapes

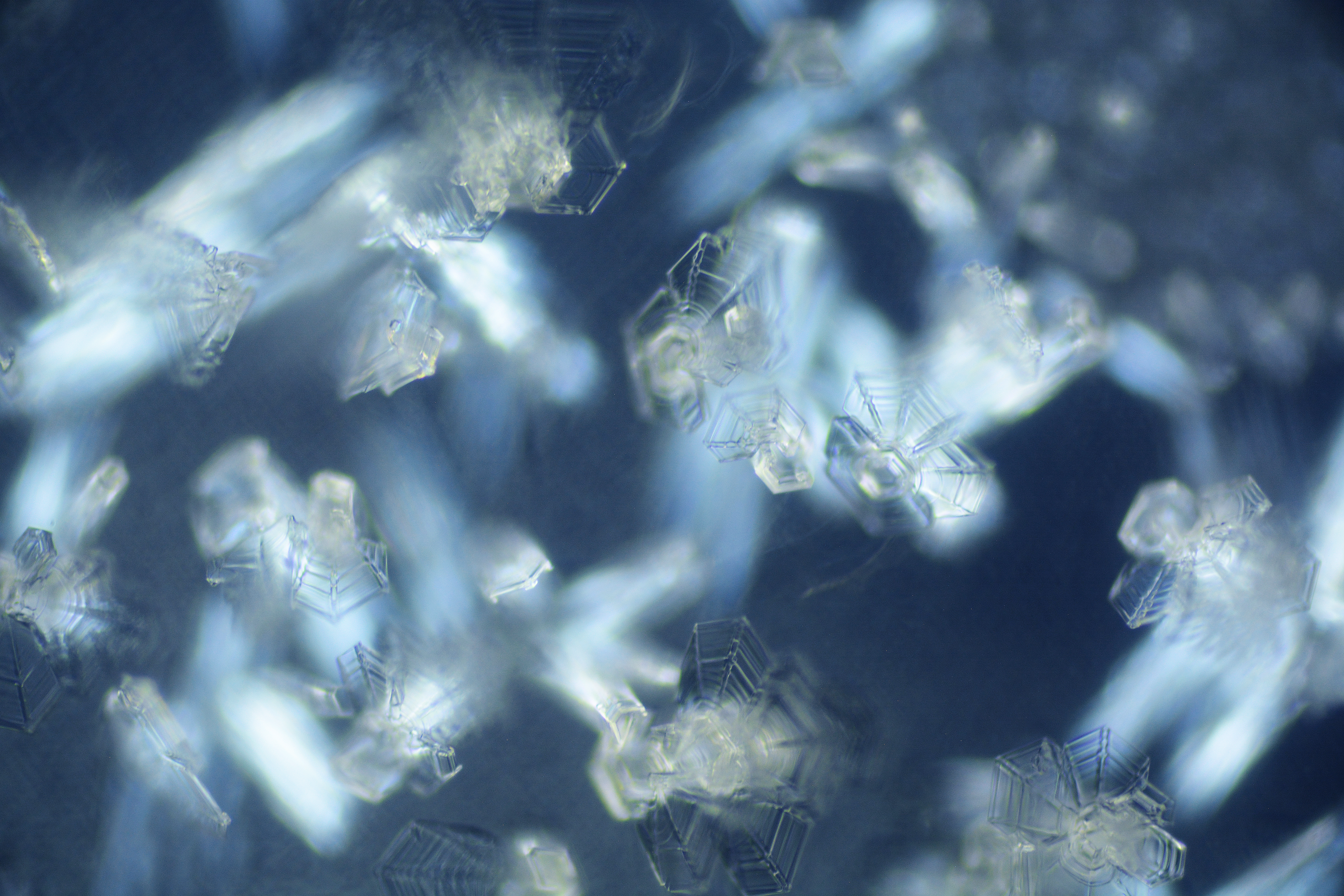
A close-up of growing ice crystals displaying typical hexagonal symmetry

Ice crystals are solid water (known as ice) in symmetrical shapes including hexagonal columns, hexagonal plates, and dendritic crystals. Ice crystals are responsible for various atmospheric optical displays and cloud formations.

== Formation ==
An example of a hexagonal plate (top) and a hexagonal column (bottom), typical ice crystal shapes

At ambient temperature and pressure, water molecules have a V shape. The two hydrogen atoms bond to the oxygen atom at a 105° angle. Ice crystals have a hexagonal crystal lattice, meaning the water molecules arrange themselves into layered hexagons upon freezing.

Slower crystal growth from colder and drier atmospheres produces more hexagonal symmetry. Depending on environmental temperature and humidity, ice crystals can develop from the initial hexagonal prism into many symmetric shapes. Possible shapes for ice crystals are columns, needles, plates and dendrites. Mixed patterns are also possible. The symmetric shapes are due to depositional growth, which is when ice forms directly from water vapor in the atmosphere. Small spaces in atmospheric particles can also collect water, freeze, and form ice crystals. This is known as nucleation. Snowflakes form when additional vapor freezes onto an existing ice crystal.

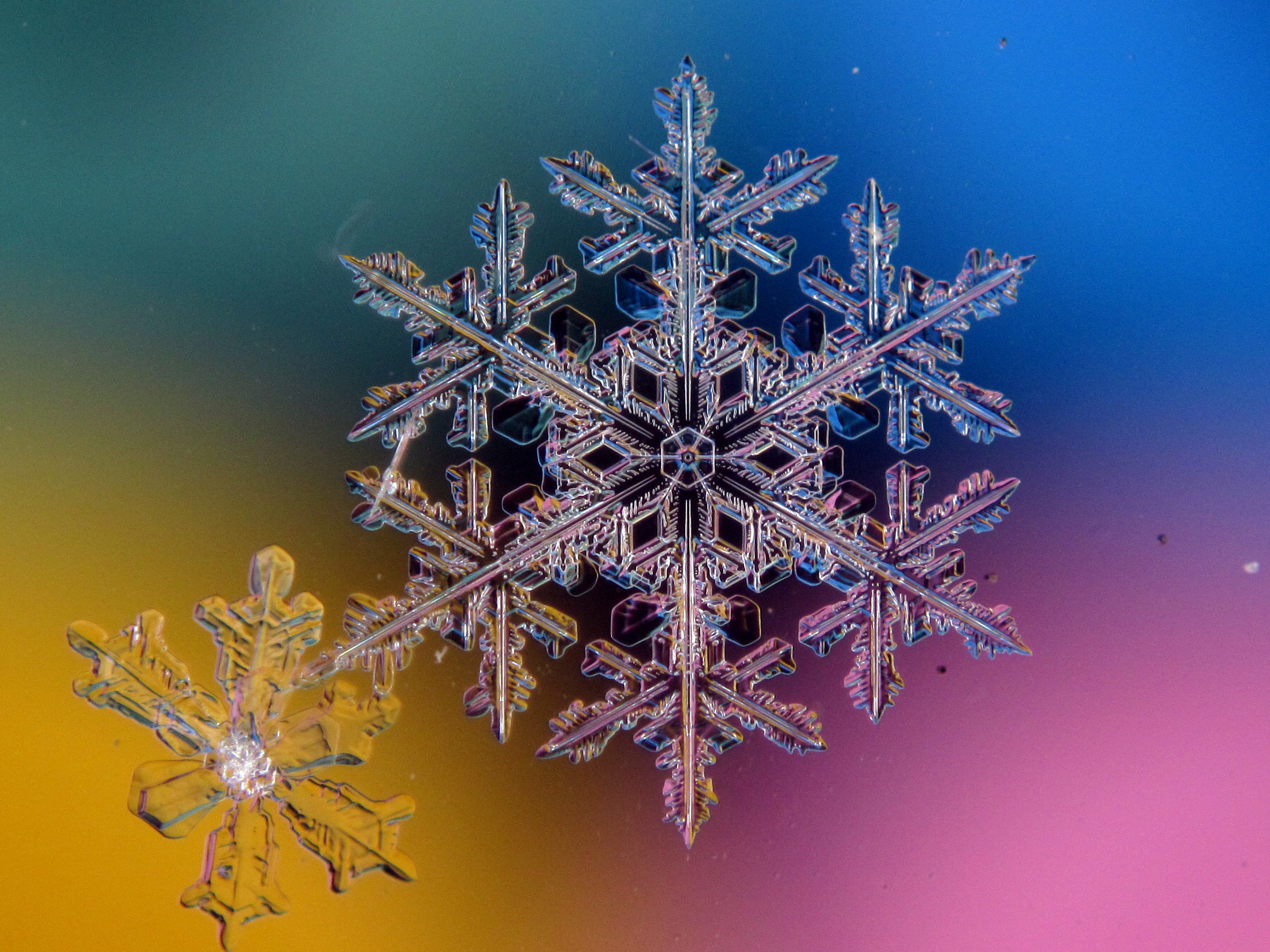
Further freezing of water on an ice crystal produces snowflakes.

=== Trigonal and cubic crystals ===
Supercooled water refers to water below its freezing point that is still liquid. Ice crystals formed from supercooled water have stacking defects in their layered hexagons. This causes ice crystals to display trigonal or cubic symmetry depending on the temperature. Trigonal or cubic crystals form in the upper atmosphere where supercooling occurs.

=== Square crystals ===
Water can pass through laminated sheets of graphene oxide unlike smaller molecules such as helium. When squeezed between two layers of graphene, water forms square ice crystals at room temperature. Researchers believe high pressure and the van der Waals force, an attractive force present between all molecules, drives the formation. The material is a new crystalline phase of ice.

== Weather phenomena ==
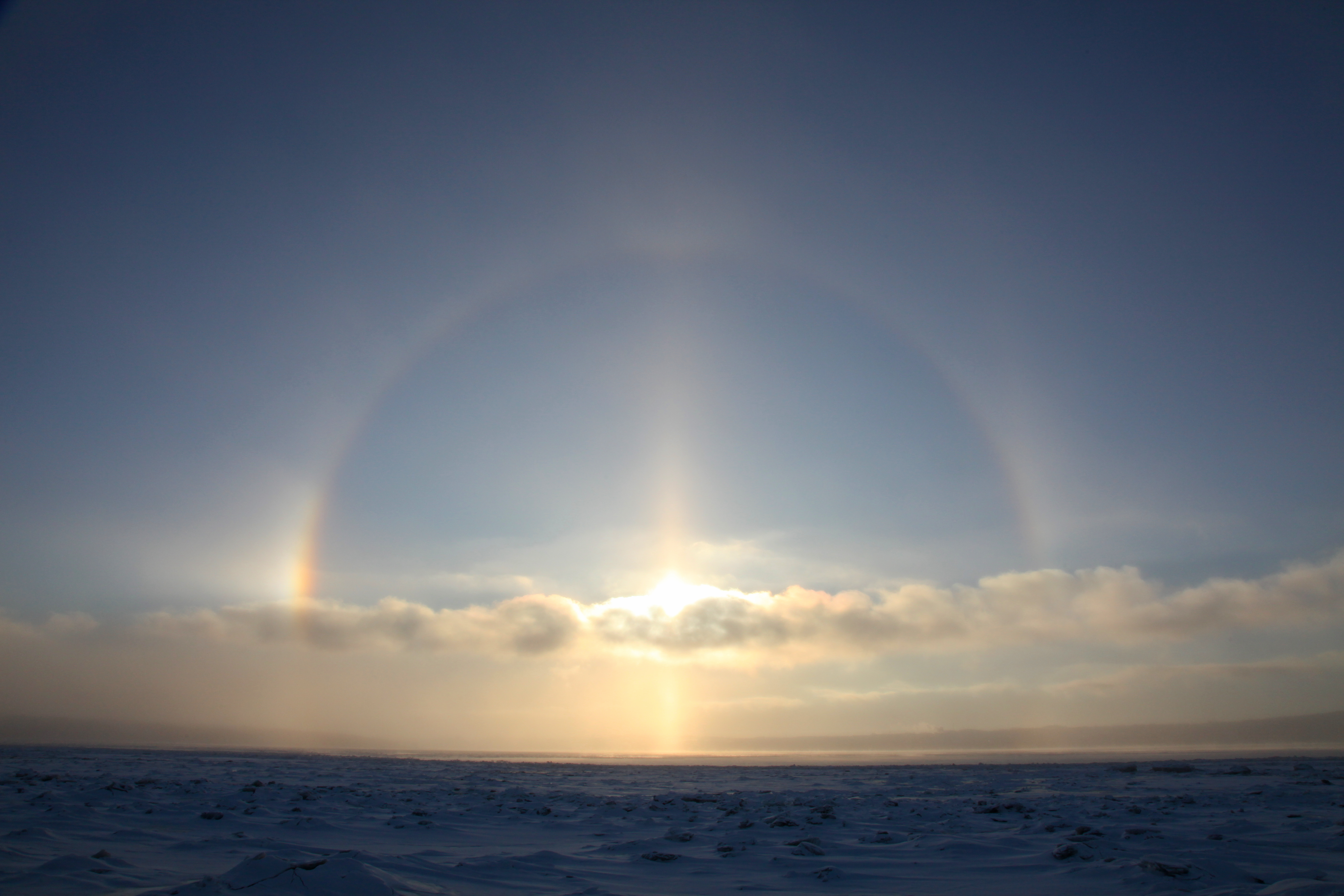
A halo created by light reflecting off of ice crystals in cirrus clouds. This specific halo is called a 22° halo.

Ice crystals create optical phenomena like diamond dust and halos in the sky due to light reflecting off of the crystals in a process called scattering.

Cirrus clouds and ice fog are made of ice crystals. Cirrus clouds are often the sign of an approaching warm front, where warm and moist air rises and freezes into ice crystals. Ice crystals rubbing against each other also produces lightning. The crystals normally fall horizontally, but electric fields can cause them to clump together and fall in other directions.

== Detection ==
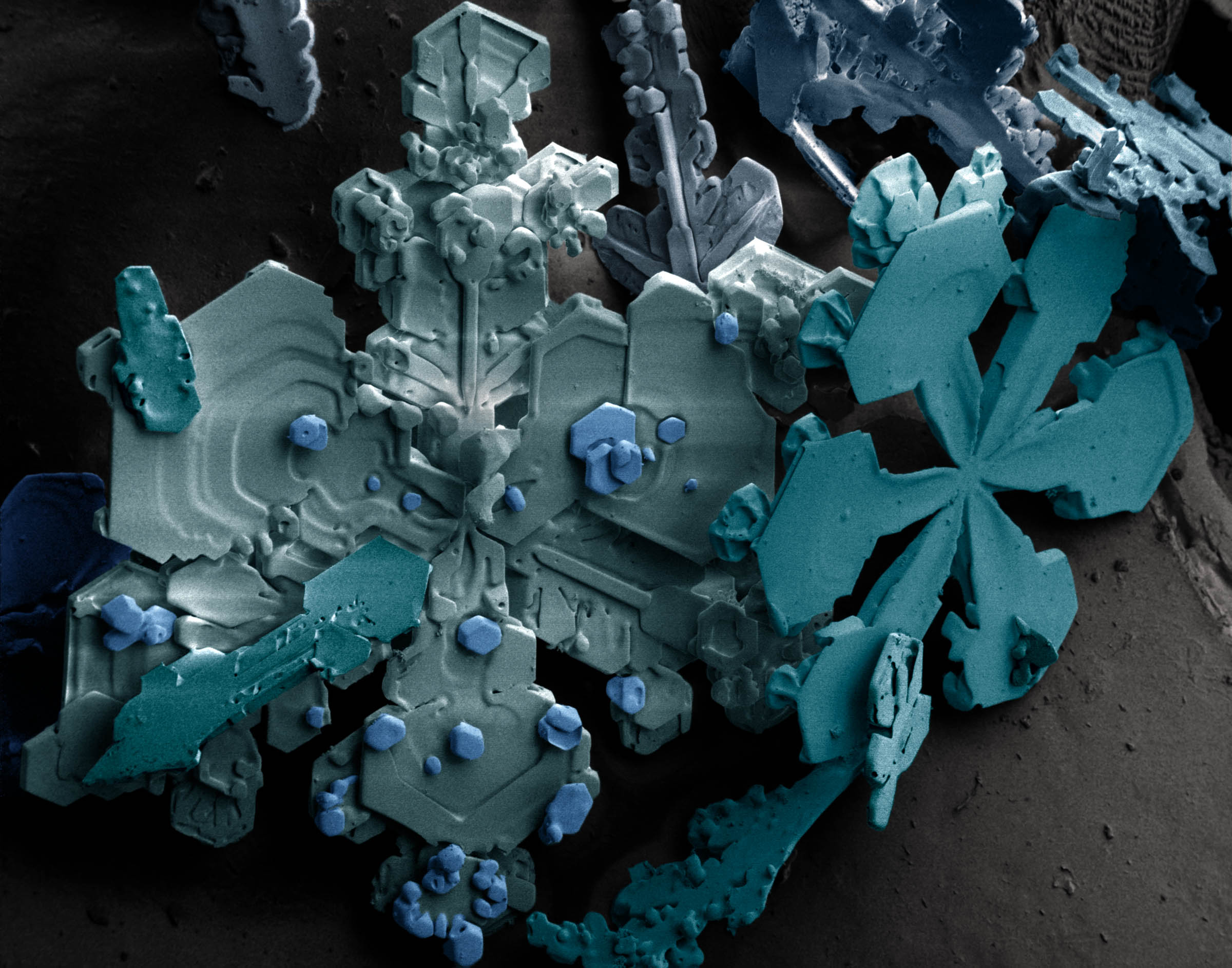
Dendritic ice crystals imaged with a scanning electron microscope. The colors are computer generated.

The aerospace industry is working to design a radar that can detect ice crystal environments to discern hazardous flight conditions. Ice crystals can melt when they touch the surface of warm aircraft, and refreeze due to environmental conditions. The accumulation of ice around the engine damages the aircraft. Weather forecasting uses differential reflectivity weather radars to identify types of precipitation by comparing a droplet's horizontal and vertical lengths. Ice crystals are larger in the horizontal direction and are thus detectable.

== See also ==
- Snow
- Snowflake
- Ice spike
- Ice lens
- Icicle
