= Sevenfold Sun miracle =

1661 Baltic atmospheric phenomenon

The Sevenfold Sun Miracle was an atmospheric phenomenon witnessed in Gdańsk in 1661. It was a complex halo phenomenon, and was described by Georg Fehlau, the pastor of the St Marien church, in a sermon two weeks later, which was then published under the title Siebenfältiges Sonnenwunder oder sieben Nebensonnen, so in diesem 1661 Jahr den 20. Februar neuen Stils am Sonntage Sexagesima um 11 Uhr bis nach 12 am Himmel bei uns sind gesehen worden ("Sevenfold sun miracle or seven sun dogs which were seen in our skies on Sexagesima Sunday, 20th of February of the year 1661 from 11 o'clock until after 12 o'clock") The same event was also described by the astronomer Johan Hevelius the following year in his book Mercurius in Sole visus Gedani.

== The event ==
On 20 February 1661 a complex halo phenomenon was observed by more than 1000 people, including Fehlau and Hevelius, both astronomers, in the city of Gdańsk on the Baltic.

As well as the true Sun, two mock Suns (parhelia) and an anthelion were seen, with halos at 22° and 46°, and topped with an upper tangent arc and a circumzenithal arc, respectively. Of particular interest to modern scientists were the mention of three further mock Suns, one at the intersection of the 22° halo and the upper tangent arc, and two others at 90° to the Sun, also at the intersections of an immense but incomplete halo.

The first is thought to be a particularly bright Parry arc, mistakenly described as a parhelion. The other two and the associated halo, which has been labelled "Hevel's halo", have no theoretical explanation, and have not been recorded since (though one possible sighting was reported in 1909). In the absence of conclusive evidence these observations are regarded as possibly being a misidentification of the rare but not unusual 120° parhelia.

== The accounts ==
On 6 March, two weeks after the event, Fehlau preached at St Mary's church; taking the event, and the widespread interest it created, as his inspiration. His sermon was later published, and contains a full account of the phenomenon.

The following year Hevelius published his book Mercurius in Sole visus Gedani ("Mercury appeared in the Sun, at Gdansk"), principally on the observation of a transit of Mercury, but containing other astronomical information, including an account of the 1661 halos.

As the two accounts are virtually identical, and as Fehlau is known to have visited Hevelius on 3 March at his observatory to look at a comet, modern astronomers believe Fehlau and Hevelius collaborated on the text, though they generally give Hevelius (being the better-known of the two) credit for the account.

== Fehlau's account ==
The translation of Fehlau's account reads (notes added for clarity):

We now come to the description of the recently appeared sundogs or parhelia, which had been observed a fortnight ago and which we talk of now. They were like this: A fortnight ago it was February 20 at about 11 a.m. when the sun was in the southeast and the air was all bright and clear. There were seven suns clearly visible in the sky at the same time, three colourful and three white ones additionally to the real sun. Around the latter one (the real sun) appeared a rather big and almost closed circle with very beautiful colours like a rainbow (the 22° halo), on which at both sides two colourful sundogs were visible which were at the same elevation as the real sun. Both of them had long clear and white tails, tapering like comets, one pointing to the east and the other one to the west (the ends of the parhelic circle).

Second, on just that circle (the 22° halo), directly above the sun, under a vertical line (possible sun pillar), there was a part of an inverted circle or rainbow, also with very beautiful colours (the upper tangent arc), with another, a bit less bright sundog in it (possible Parry arc).

Third there was a very much larger circle with also a lot of beautiful colours around the Sun (the 46° halo), surrounding the other one, a bit fainter and not totally closed as the horizon was too near and the diameter of the circle too big, on which near the uppermost point an inverted part of a rainbow was visible (the circumzenithal arc), very bright and with beautiful colours.

Fourth there was a very white and silvery circle emerging from the two sundogs beside the real Sun (the parhelic circle), which surrounded the whole horizon and was in all parts at the same distance, which was about 20 degrees: On this circle there were three other silver Suns, one in the northwest, opposite the real Sun (the anthelion). The other one in the northeast and the third one in the southwest (Hevelius's 90° parhelia; though possibly 120° parhelia in fact). Through these two latter ones as eastern and western one passed a white piece of an arc coming from above ("Hevel's halo"), also through the big circle they were standing upon. So that through these two white sundogs a white cross seemed to pass, which appeared very amazing for about one hour and a half before everything disappeared. It was an overwhelmingly beautiful picture, in which seven suns were visible at the same time, which never had been observed before. Yes, scholars (possibly Hevelius) believe that, if this picture had been observed a little earlier, there would have been visible nine suns at the same time.

== See also ==
- The Vadersolstavlan; a depiction of a similar event at Stockholm, in 1535
- Christoph Scheiner; published the first scientific description of a complex halo event at Rome in 1631
- Tobias Lowitz (de); recorded a complex halo event, which included his Lowitz arc, at St Petersburg in 1790
