= Liljequist =

Liljequist may refer to:

- Gösta Hjalmar Liljequist (1914–1995), Swedish meteorologist
- Liljequist Heights, heights about 2 nautical miles (3.7 km) south of Grunehogna Peaks, in the Ahlmann Ridge of Queen Maud Land
- Liljequist parhelion, a rare halo, an optical phenomenon appearing on the parhelic circle approximately ±150-160° from the sun
- Robert Liljequist (born 1971), retired male badminton player from Finland
