= Anthelion =

Rare optical phenomenon

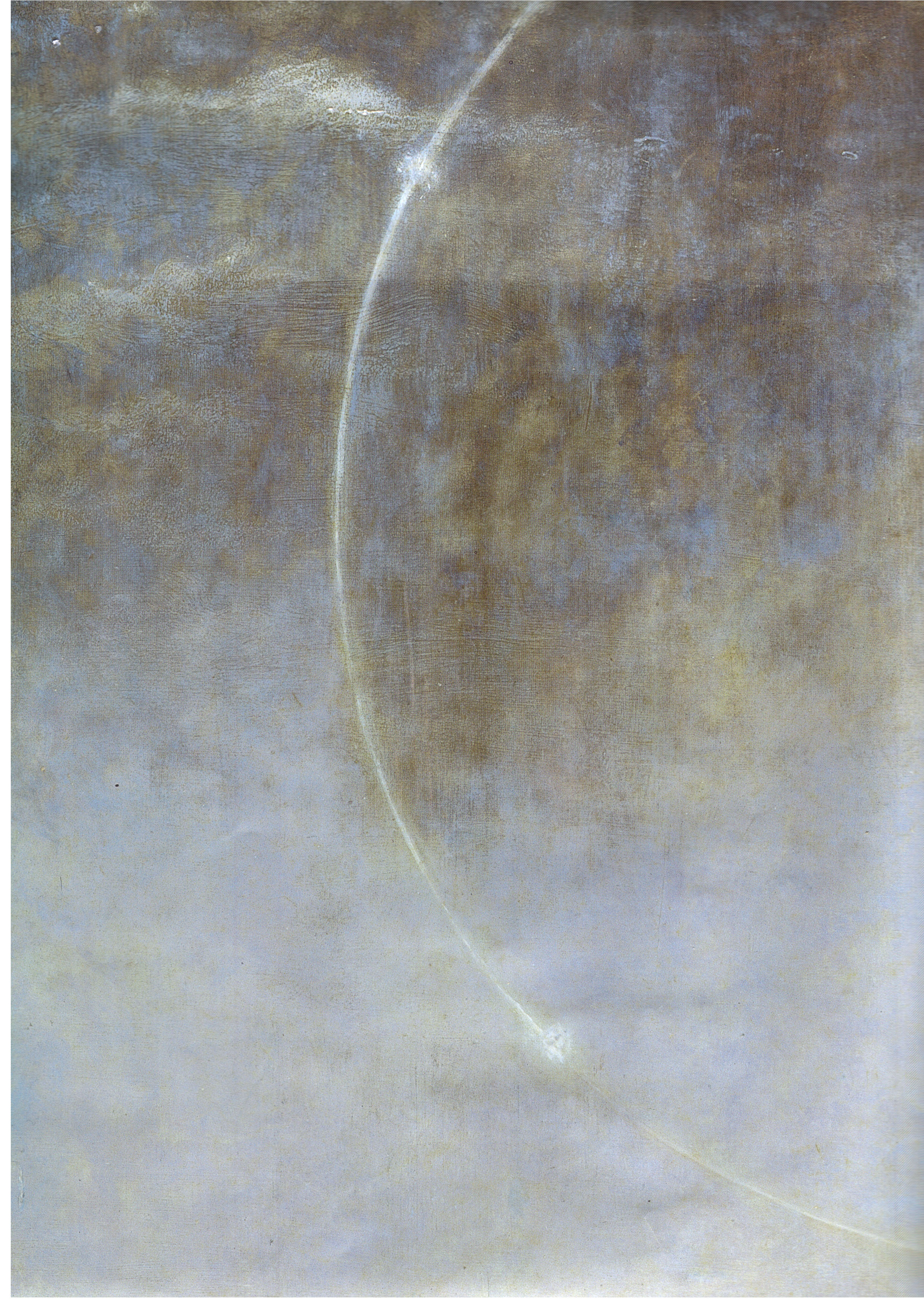
Anthelion (bottom) and 120° parhelion (top) depicted in Vädersolstavlan

An anthelion (plural anthelia, from late Greek ανθηλιος, "opposite the sun") is a rare optical phenomenon of the halo family. It appears on the parhelic circle opposite to the Sun as a faint white spot, not unlike a sundog, and may be crossed by an X-shaped pair of diffuse arcs.

How anthelia are formed is disputed. Walter Tape, among others, has argued they are not separate haloes, but simply where various haloes caused by horizontally oriented column-shaped ice crystals coincide on the parhelic circle to create a bright spot. If this theory is correct, anthelia should only appear together with these other haloes.

However, anthelia occur unaccompanied by other plate crystal haloes, thus scientists have produced alternative explanations. The Dutch professor S.W. Visser proposed they form by two exterior light reflections in quadrangular prisms, while Robert Greenler has suggested two interior reflections in column-shaped crystals produces the phenomenon.

While the anthelion area is usually sparse on haloes, in a complex display it features various rare optic phenomena: Flanking the anthelion on the parhelic circle are two 120° parhelia (and two Liljequist parhelia) caused by plate crystals. The Tricker and diffuse arcs are produced in singly oriented column crystals and form an ankh-like shape passing through the anthelion. Wegener arcs occasionally cross the sky to converge in the anthelion.

== See also ==
- False sunrise
- Glory
- Rainbow
