= Liljequist parhelion =

Atmospheric optical phenomenon

A Liljequist parhelion is a rare halo, an optical phenomenon in the form of a brightened spot on the parhelic circle approximately 150–160° from the sun; i.e., between the position of the 120° parhelion and the anthelion.

While the sun touches the horizon, a Liljequist parhelion is located approximately 160° from the sun and is about 10° long. As the sun rises up to 30° the phenomenon gradually moves towards 150°, and as the sun reaches over 30° the optical effect vanishes. The parhelia are caused by light rays passing through oriented plate crystals. Like the 120° parhelia, the Liljequist parhelia display a white-bluish colour. This colour is, however, associated with the parhelic circle itself, not the ice crystals causing the Liljequist parhelia.

The phenomenon was first observed by Gösta Hjalmar Liljequist in 1951 at Maudheim, Antarctica during the Norwegian–British–Swedish Antarctic Expedition in 1949–1952. It was then simulated by Dr. Eberhard Tränkle (1937–1997) and Robert Greenler in 1987 and theoretically explained by Walter Tape in 1994.

A theoretical and experimental investigation of the Liljequist parhelion caused by perfect hexagonal plate crystals showed that the azimuthal position of maximum intensity occurs at

$\theta_{{\rm L}1}=2\arccos\left(n\sin\left(\frac{\pi}{3} - \alpha_{\rm TIR}\right)\right)$,

where the refractive index $n$ to use for the angle $\alpha_{\rm TIR}=\arcsin(1/n)$ of total internal reflection is Bravais' index for inclined rays, i.e. $n(e)=\sqrt{n^2-\sin\left(e\right)^2}/\cos\left(e\right)$ for a solar elevation $e$. For ice at zero solar elevation this angle is $\theta_{{\rm L}1}\approx 153^{\circ}$. The dispersion of ice causes a variation of this angle, leading to a blueish/cyan coloring close to this azimuthal coordinate. The halo ends towards the anthelion at an angle $\theta_{{\rm L}2}^{\rm max}$

$\theta_{{\rm L}2}^{\rm max}=\frac{5\pi}{6} + \arcsin\left(n\sin\left(\frac{\pi}{3}-\alpha_{\rm TIR}\right)\right)$.

== See also ==
- Sun dog
