= Moon dog =

Bright spot on a lunar halo

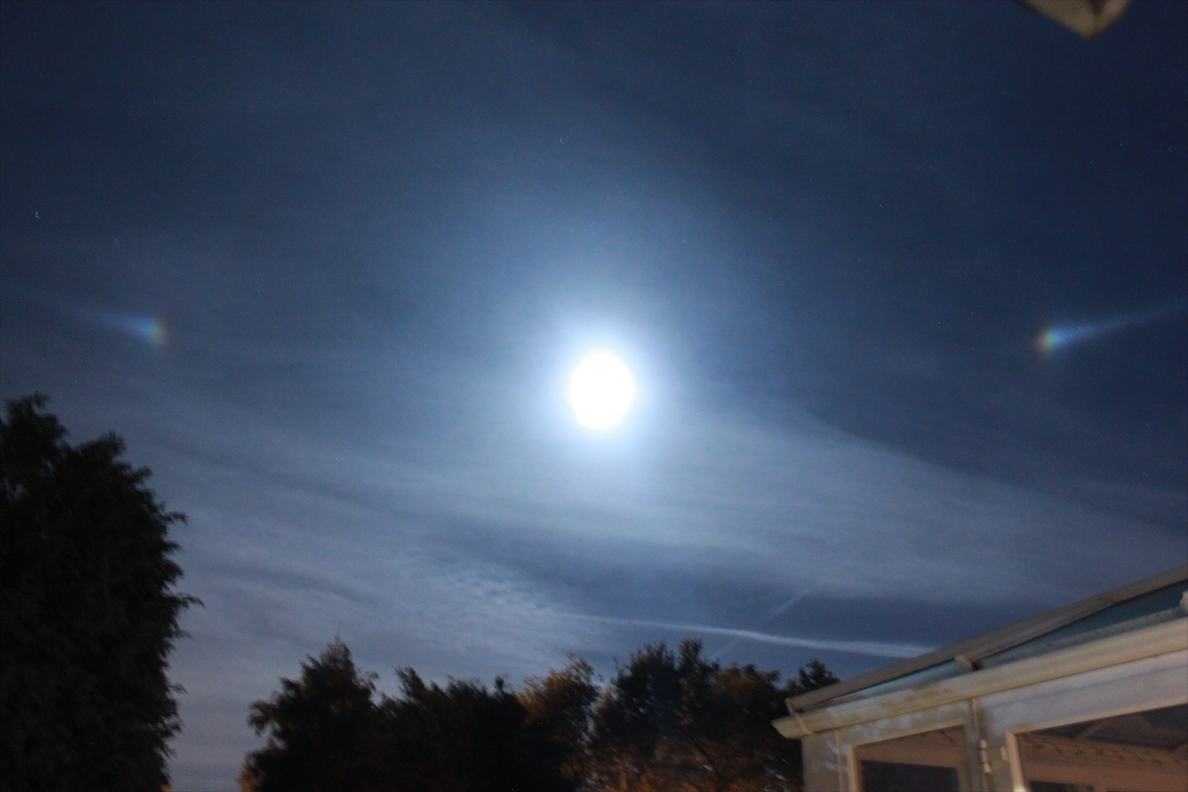
Pair of moon dogs

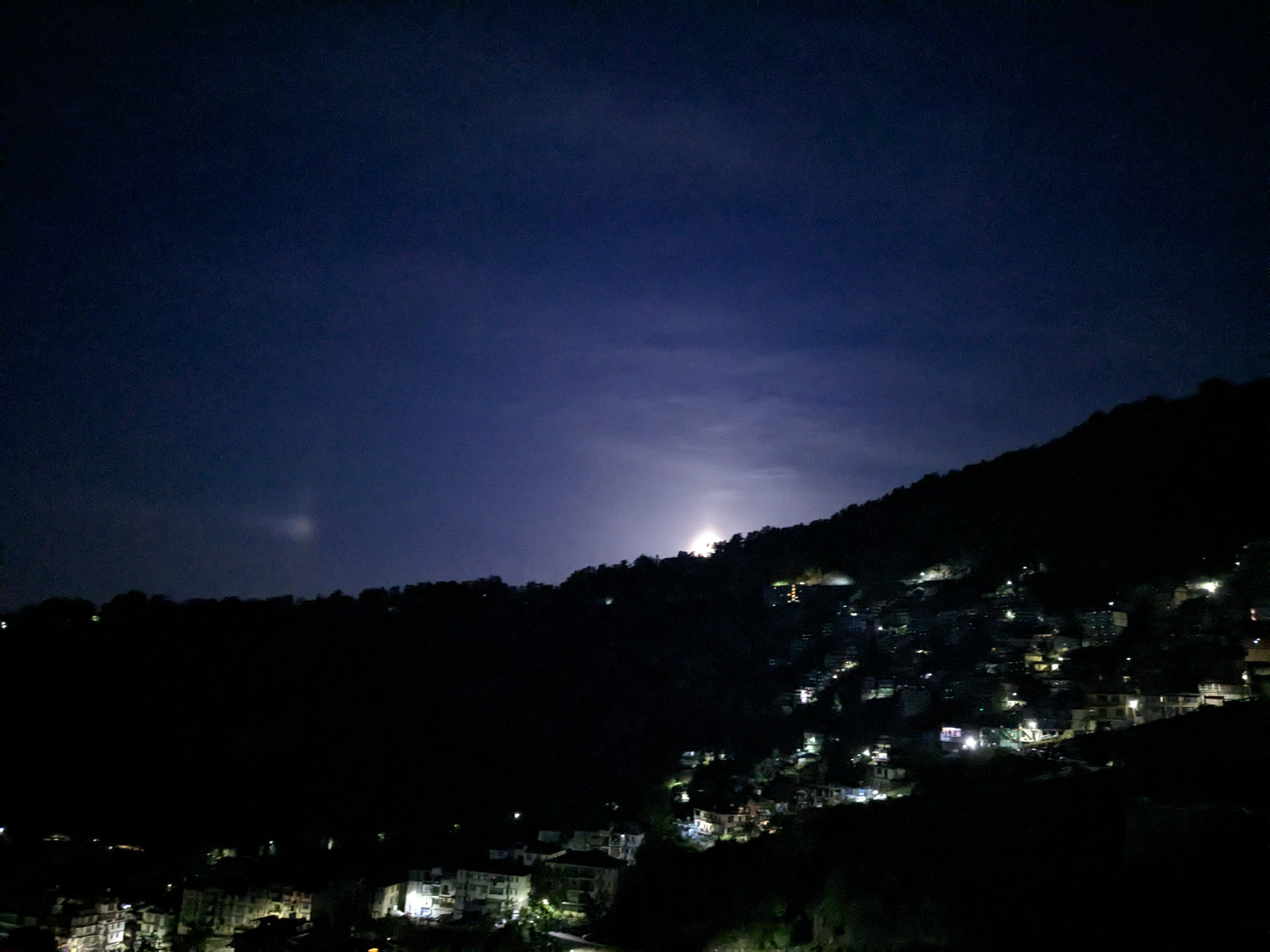
Partial Moon dog seen from Hillspeak, Shimla, Lower Himalayas.

A moon dog (or moondog) or mock moon, also called a paraselene (plural paraselenae or paraselenes) in meteorology, is an atmospheric optical phenomenon that consists of a bright spot to one or both sides of the Moon. They are exactly analogous to sun dogs.

A member of the halo family, moon dogs are caused by the refraction of moonlight by hexagonal-plate-shaped ice crystals in cirrus clouds or cirrostratus clouds. They typically appear as a pair of faint patches of light, at around 22° to the left and right of the Moon, and at the same altitude above the horizon as the Moon. They may also appear alongside 22° halos.

Moon dogs are rarer than sun dogs because the Moon must be bright, about quarter moon or more, for the moon dogs to be observed. Moon dogs show little color to the unaided human eye because their light is not bright enough to activate the eye's cone cells.

== Formation and Characteristics ==
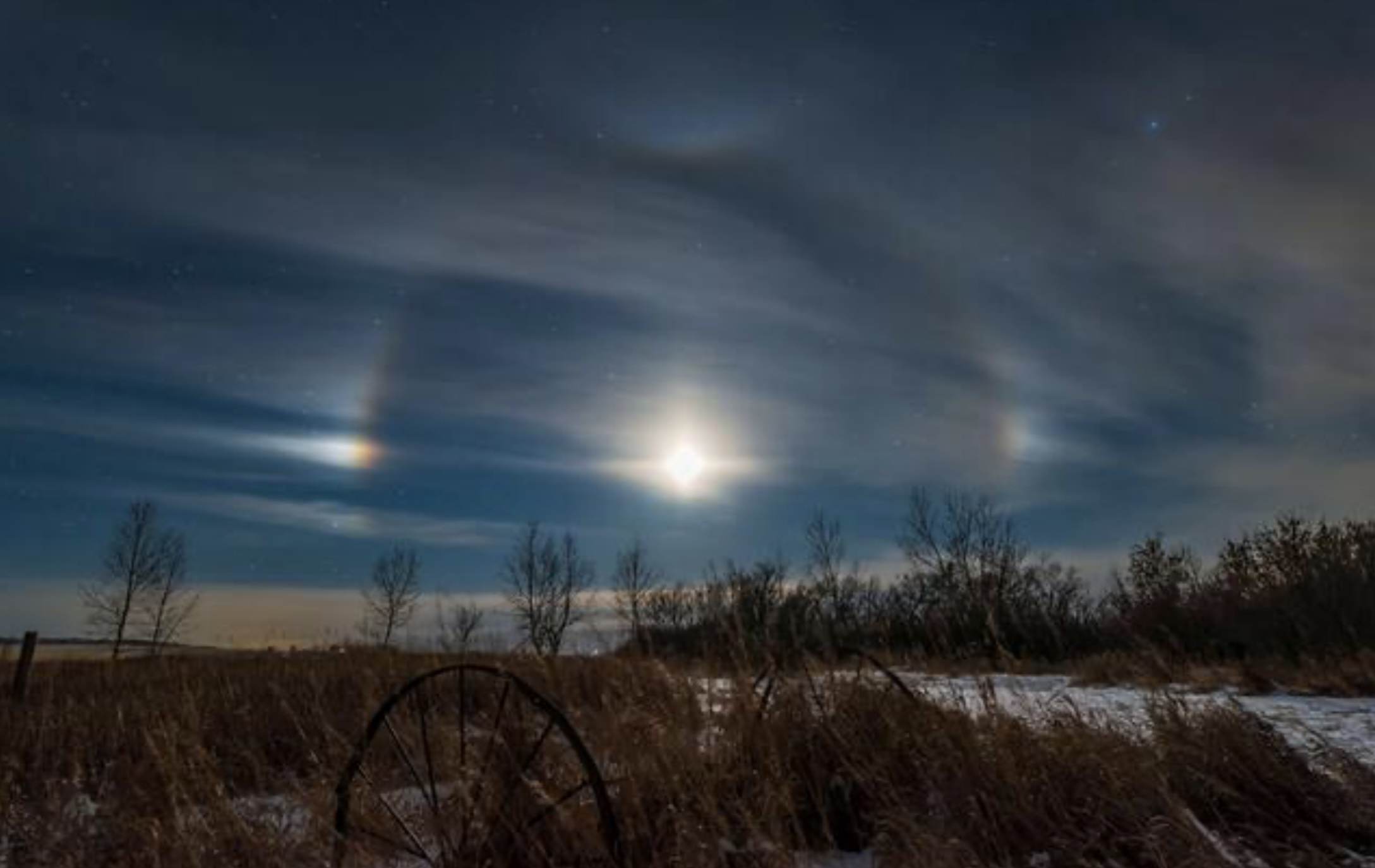
Moon dogs appear next to the crescent moon in Alberta, Canada.

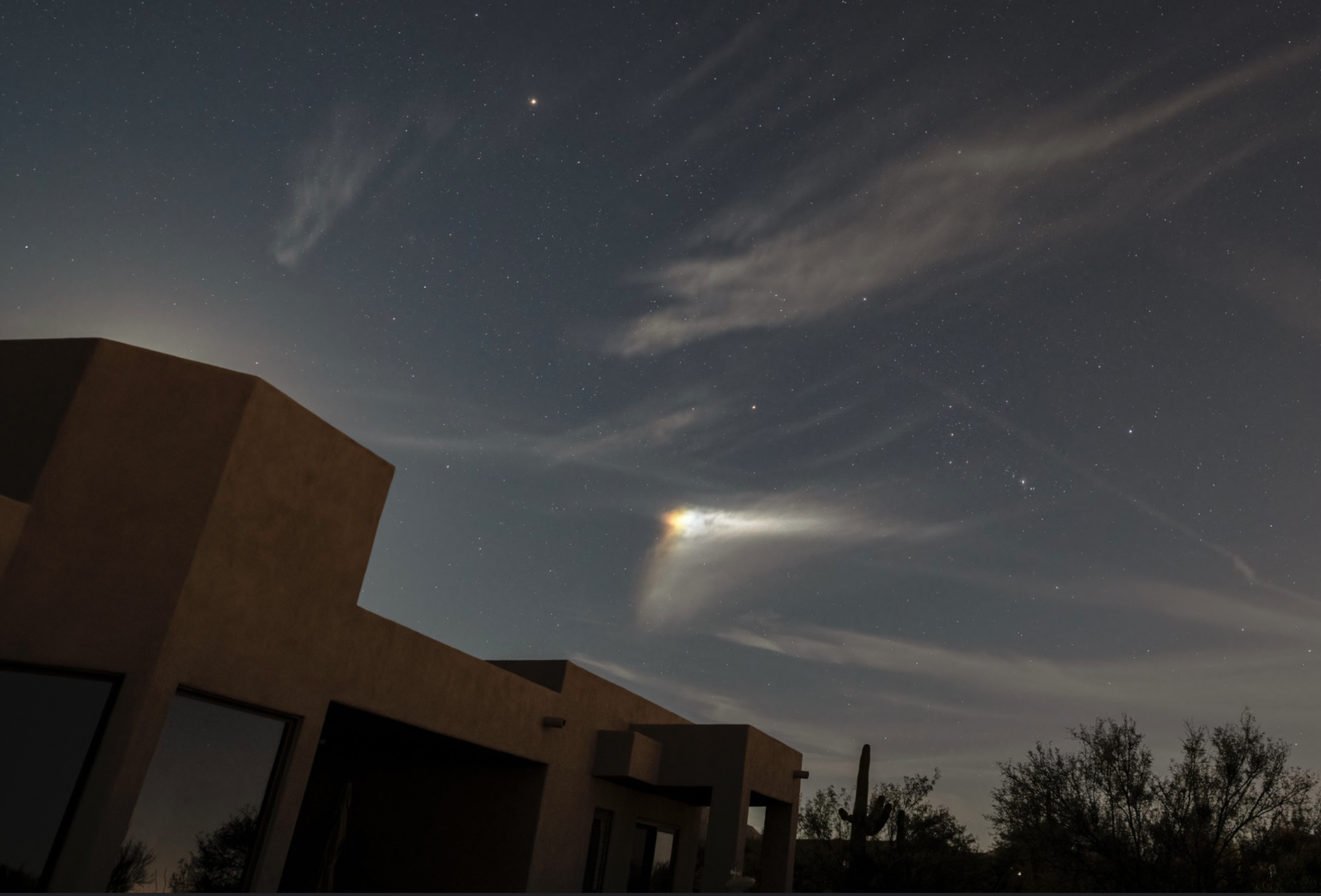
Moon dog on the right side of the moon that was blocked by the building in Tucson AZ.

Moon dogs are formed by the refraction of light through hexagonal, plate-shaped ice crystals that are typically suspended in thin, high cirrus clouds or cirrostratus clouds. The crystals act as tiny prisms, bending the moonlight by about 22°, so the moon dogs appear at that angular distance from the Moon. Because the light of the Moon is fainter than that of the Sun, moon dogs are often pale or whitish, their colors, if visible, are muted, and when the Moon is especially bright—almost full moon—moon dogs are easier to see. Moon dogs are positioned at the same elevation above the horizon as the Moon, like sun dogs, their vertical extent depends on the wobbling of the ice crystals: larger crystals that tilt more create taller moon dogs.

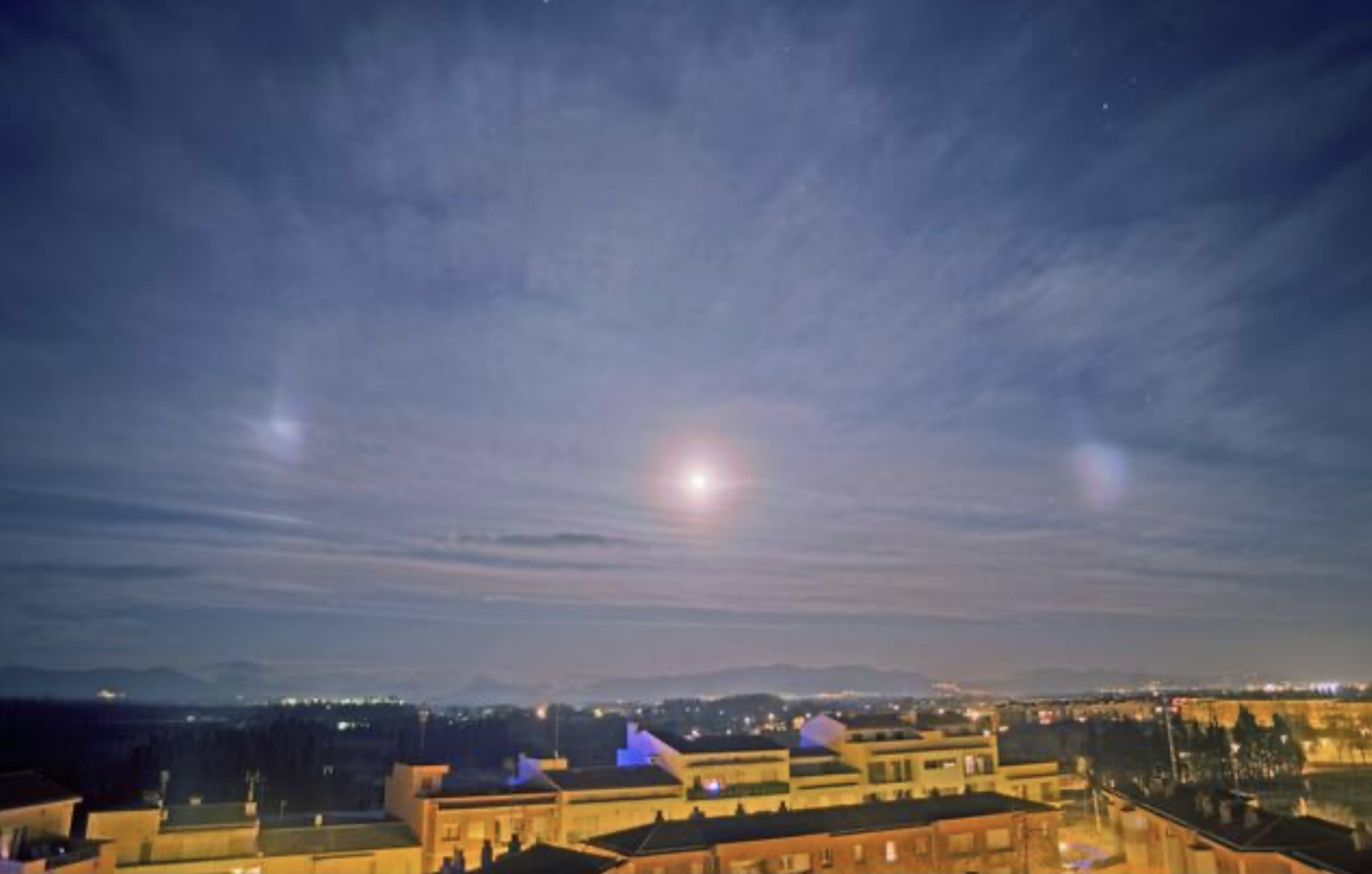
Moon dogs (white) spotted on both sides of the moon (red) over a city.

The color of the moon dog, when discernible, follow the same pattern as sun dogs: red nearest the Moon, with outer parts fading through orange and blue. However, the colors are usually much less vivid, often blending into the surrounding white halo or into the parhelic circle, if present. Because of this, many moon dogs appear as bright, whitish patches rather than rainbow-colored spots.

A paraselene, or mock moon, appears as a band of faint white light stretching across the sky at the same altitude as the Moon. It forms when moonlight is refracted and reflected by countless tiny, flat, hexagonal ice crystals suspended in high, thin clouds. While often seen as partial arcs or segments, under ideal conditions it can encircle the entire sky in a complete 360° ring. When the Moon is high, the display appears as a broad halo centered near the zenith; when the Moon is lower, it becomes a horizontal band spanning the horizon. This delicate optical phenomenon is typically short-lived and fades quickly, often connecting the Moon to bright spots of light known as paraselenae, or moon dogs, from which the effect takes its name.

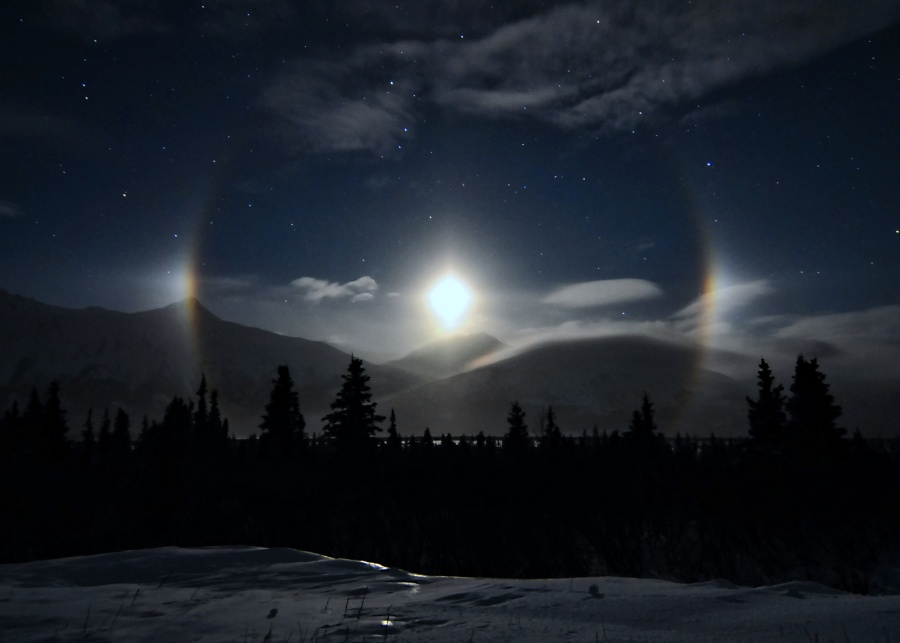
Two moon dogs surrounded by icy halos in Lower Miller Creek, Alaska, USA.

The same ice crystals that produce moon dogs can also create other halo phenomena, such as the circumzenithal arc and the 22° halo. These features often occur together in the sky, and the 22° halo can seem to link the two moon dogs in a circular arc around the Moon. As the Moon rises higher, the angle of refraction through the crystals changes, and the moon dogs appear to shift slightly outward from the 22° halo while remaining at the Moon's altitude.

Light mists and streaks of white clouds drifted across the sky. Around the moon, a glowing ring - estimated at about 150-degree^{*15-degree} in radius - was visible. Inside this ring appeared a cross of equal brightness, with its horizontal and vertical arms meeting at the moon's center. At the points where the horizontal arm touched the ring, the brightness did not appear stronger.

A similar formation of optical phenomenon to the moon dogs is the light pillars.

== Terminology ==
A common misunderstanding is to call any halo seen around the Moon a "moon dog". In reality, moon dogs are only a specific form of ice halo, created by refraction through plate-shaped ice crystals. The frequently observed 22° halo, which appears as a full ring around the Moon, is often mistaken for a pair of moon dogs and describing the phenomenon more broadly, the term ice crystal halos or simply halos is more accurate.

== Etymology ==
The etymology of the "moon dog" phenomenon comes from the combination of the words "moon" and "dog". The term "moon-dog" originated in the 1660s and refers to a dog that bays at the moon. An earlier related term is "mooner" from the 1570s, which also refers to a similar concept.

The word "dog" in this context has Old English roots, "docga", and was used to describe a powerful breed of canine; its exact origins remain uncertain. "Moon" comes from ancient words in various languages that originally denoted the month or the heavenly body, with Greek "selēnē" linked to light and brightness.

The "moon dog" phenomenon itself is a type of atmospheric optical event, also called a paraselene, where bright spots appear on either side of the Moon due to the refraction of moonlight by hexagonal ice crystals in cirrus clouds. This atmospheric effect is analogous to the "sun dog" phenomenon, which has a similarly obscure etymology, with "dog" possibly relating to tracking or following the sun, or connected to older Nordic mythology about wolves (solhunde) hunting the sun or moon.

In summary, the name "moon dog" combines the celestial element "moon" with the metaphorical "dog" that follows or bays at it, capturing both the visual phenomenon and folkloric naming traditions rooted in English and older Indo-European linguistic elements.

Another description of the term "moon dog" was written by The Buffalo (New York) Commercial Advertiser, 17 Dec. 1850:

"One of the most singular phenomena, caused by the refractive agency of the atmosphere upon the lunar rays, occurred last evening that we have ever witnessed. We certainly never saw the like. The moon was surrounded with a halo of immense diameter, while at opposite points of the ring, situated relatively on the plane of the horizon, were two auroral offshoots of light, called we believe, in common language, moon dogs."

Later, the term "paraselene" was called a "mock moon", before "moon dog", which was written by The Belvidere (Illinois) Standard, 8 Jan. 1861:

"We omitted last week to notice the rare phenomena in the heavens on Saturday evening previous to our publication day. As the moon ascended the horizon in the East, she was accompanied by two moon dogs, or mock moons, one on each side, of almost equal brilliancy with old Luna herself."

== History ==
=== Early Modern Era ===
Historically and in folklore, moon dogs have often been seen as omens or signs of significant changes. For example, some cultures, like the Inuit folklore, viewed moon dogs as spirits guiding travelers across the frozen landscapes. Folklore also commonly associates moon dogs with approaching weather changes, especially the approach of storms, since the cirrus clouds that create the phenomenon often mean bad weather.

The name "moon dog" itself has historical roots dating back to the 1660s and combines celestial imagery ("moon") with the metaphor of a dog that follows the moon, connecting to older traditions and mythologies where dogs or wolf-like creatures were linked to celestial bodies.

In addition to these weather-related and guiding spirits interpretations, moon dogs have metaphorical significance in older cultures, sometimes linked to mythologies involving wolves or dogs that hunt or follow the sun or moon, highlighting their symbolic role as supernatural guides.

=== Late Modern Era ===
Howard Miles's letter in the December 2006 Journal reminded John Naylor of his own sighting of "mock moons" back in 1990. On August 10 of that year, between 22:50 and 23:15 UT, he observed two mock moons along with a 22° halo. The Moon was about four days past full. Similar to Miles's report, one mock moon appeared noticeably brighter than the other, though in my case the brighter one lay to the Moon's north. As John Naylor also noted, the display was short-lived. His observing notes do not mention any color, but the original photograph does show some, since a long exposure can capture light beyond what the eye can detect.

In principle, parselenae should be no rarer than parhelia, and John Naylor has noted that halos or parhelia are visible almost weekly for at least an hour. However, for mock moons to be bright enough to see, the Moon usually needs to be at least half illuminated—roughly between first quarter and full—so theoretically they occur only about half as often as parhelia. Despite this, they are not extraordinarily rare.

A photograph John Naylor took on August 10, 1990, at 22:55 UT with a 50 mm lens at f/2 and an 10-second exposure on Kodak Ektachrome 200 film shows one such parselene. A nearby streetlight illuminated the foreground tree, and the contrast was slightly enhanced after scanning.

John Naylor suspects the main reason so few observations of parselenae are reported is that they tend to appear when the Moon is bright and when the sky is filled with cirrus—conditions under which many astronomers are not observing. Thus, parselenae may be better described as infrequently noticed rather than truly rare. John Naylor also saw and photographed a parhelion earlier that same day at 18:25.

== See also ==
- Halo (optical phenomenon)
- Circumhorizontal arc
- Circumzenithal arc
- Gegenschein
- Zodiacal light
- Light pillar
