= Sun dog =

Atmospheric optical phenomenon

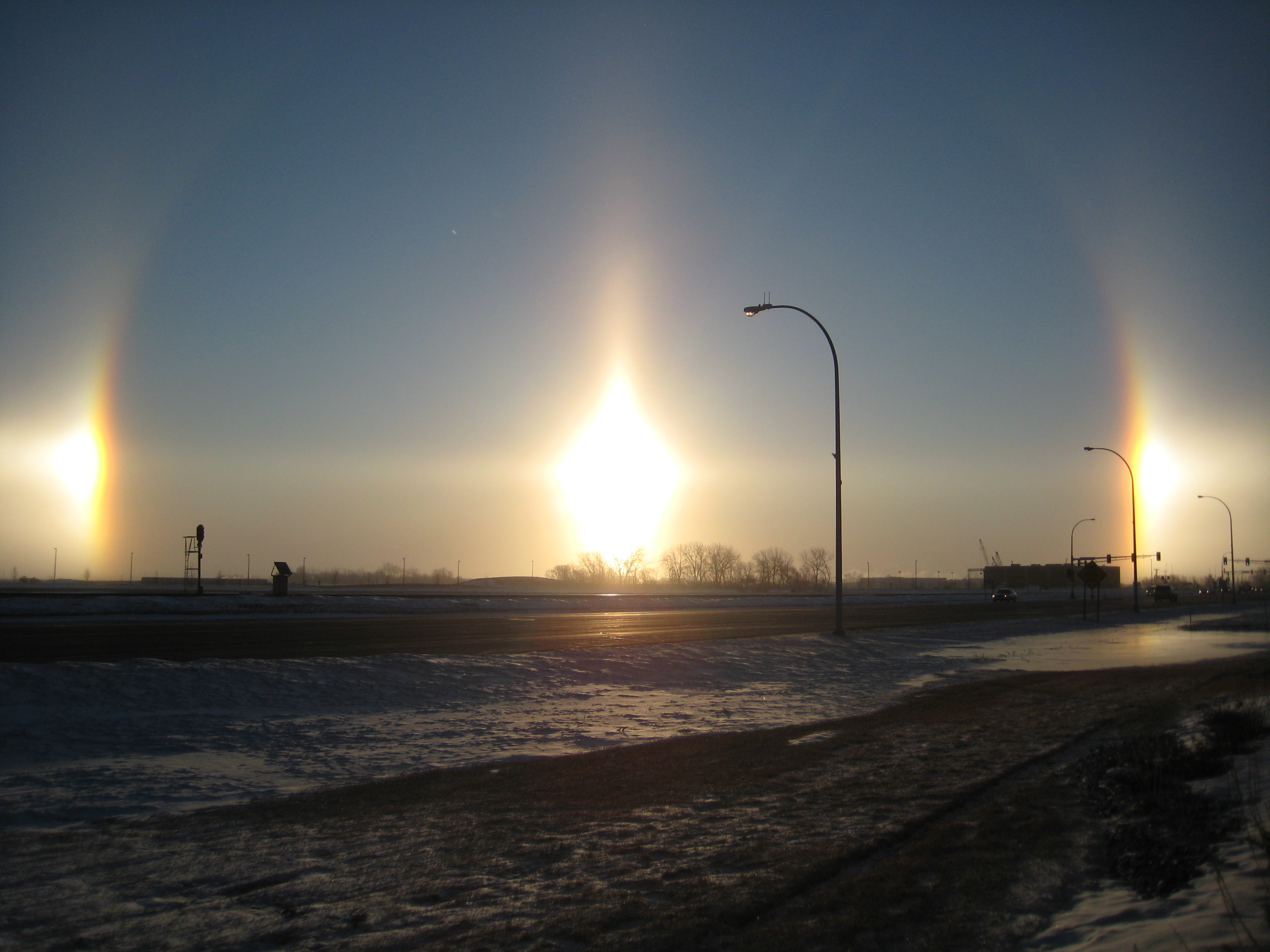
Very bright sun dogs in Fargo, North Dakota. Also visible are parts of the 22° halo (the arcs passing through each sun dog), a sun pillar (the vertical line), and the parhelic circle (the horizontal line).

A sun dog, sundog or mock sun, also called a parhelion (plural parhelia) in atmospheric science, is an atmospheric optical phenomenon that consists of a bright spot to one or both sides of the Sun. Two sun dogs often flank the Sun within a 22° halo, parallel to the horizon.

The sun dog is a member of the family of halos caused by the refraction of sunlight by ice crystals in the atmosphere. Sun dogs typically appear as a pair of subtly colored patches of light, around 22° to the left and right of the Sun, and at the same altitude above the horizon as the Sun. They can be seen anywhere in the world during any season, but are not always obvious or bright. Sun dogs are best seen and most conspicuous when the Sun is near the horizon.

== Formation and characteristics ==
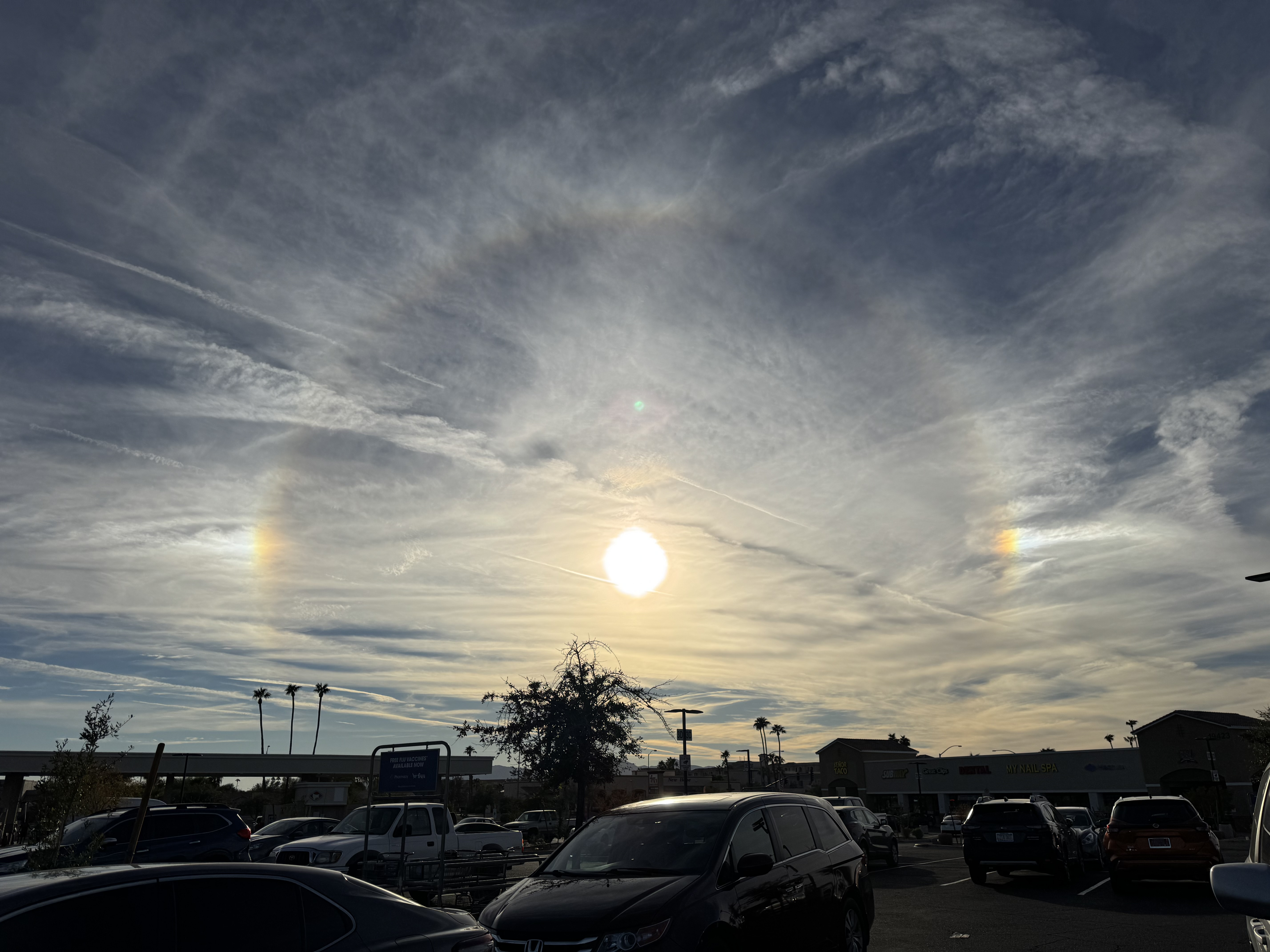
Two sun dogs, and a partial 22° halo in Sun City West, Arizona

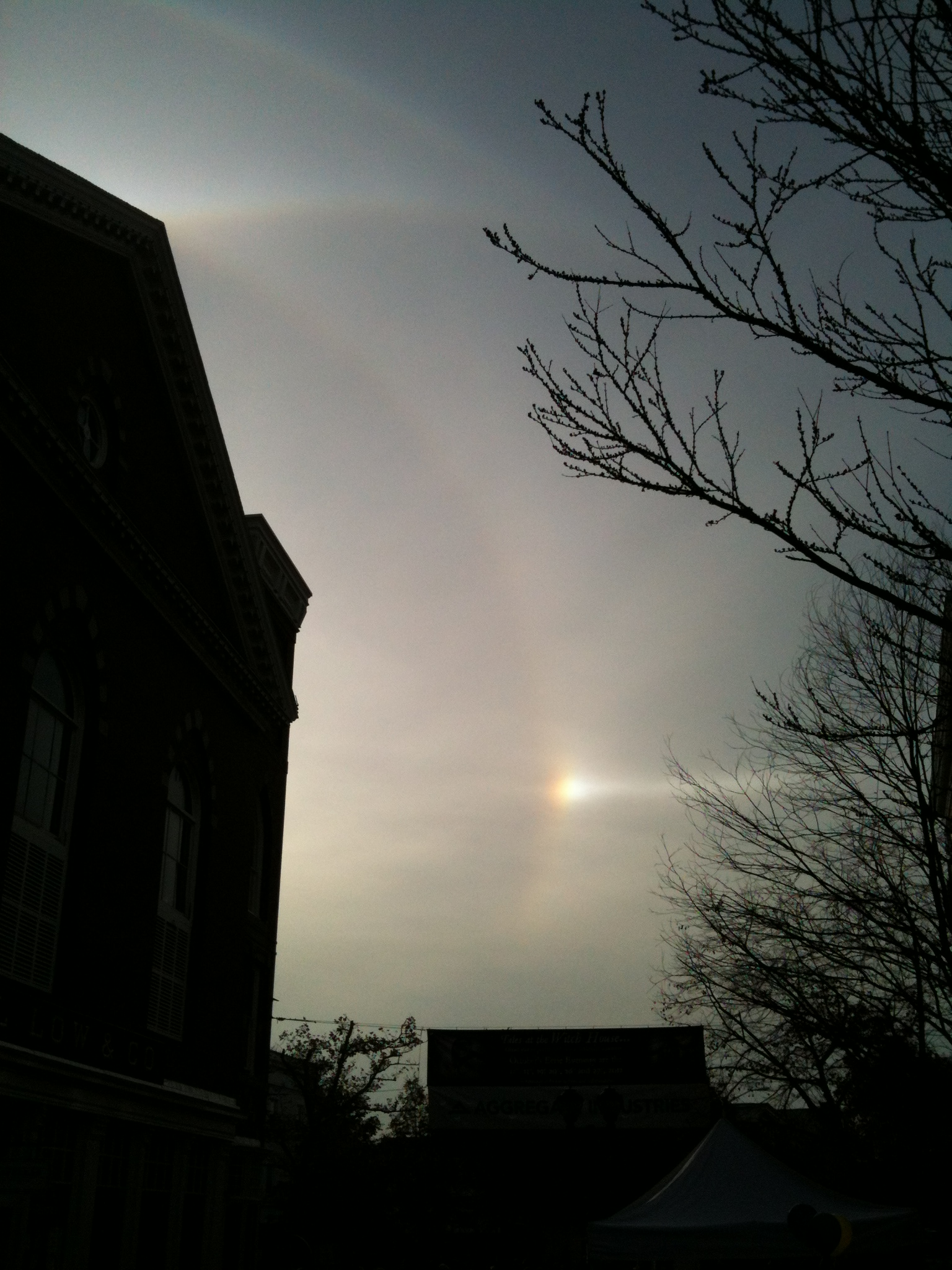
A right-hand sun dog in Salem, Massachusetts. Also visible are a Parry arc, an upper tangent arc, a 22° halo, and part of the parhelic circle.

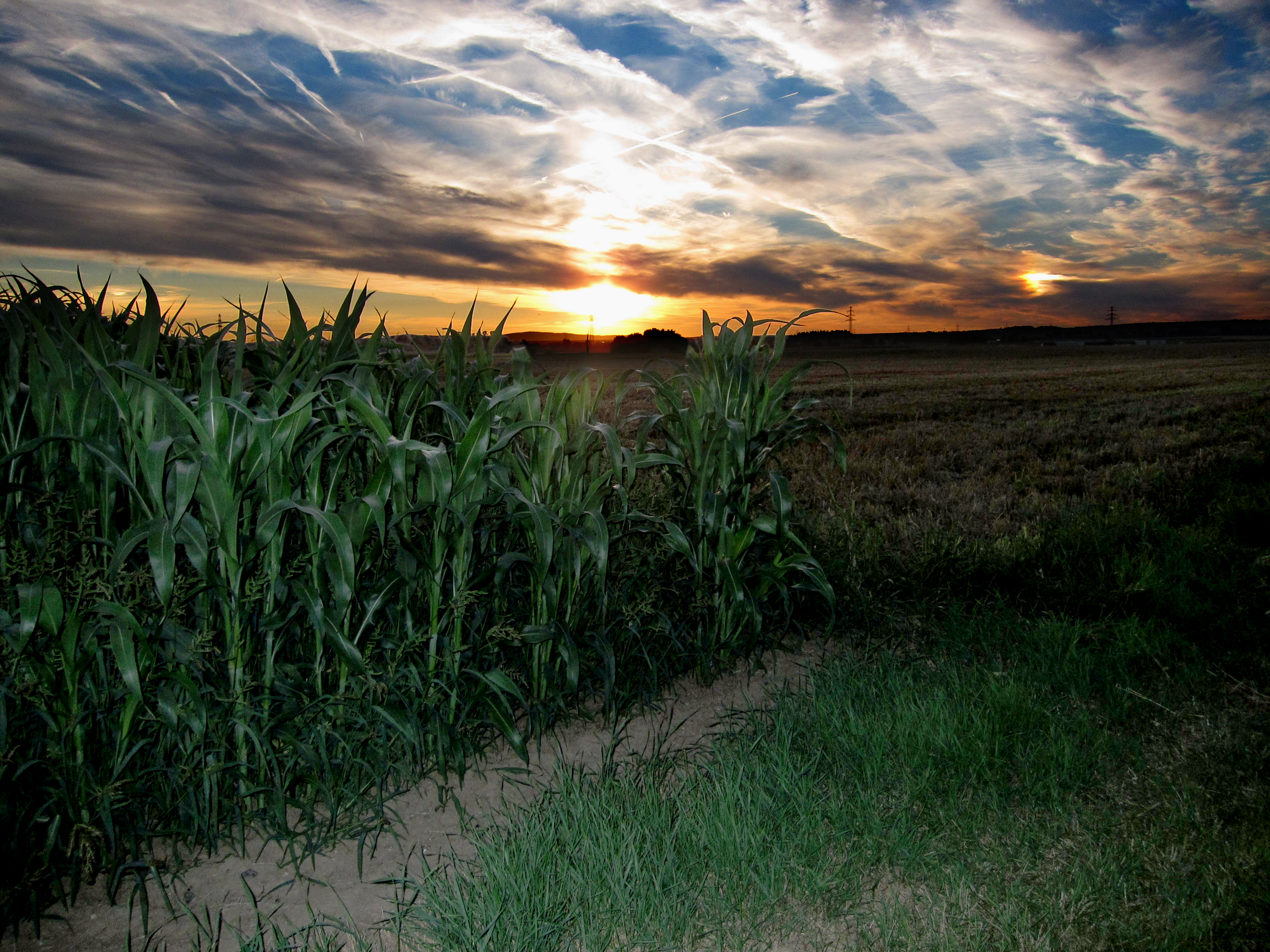
Sun dogs in Hesse, Germany

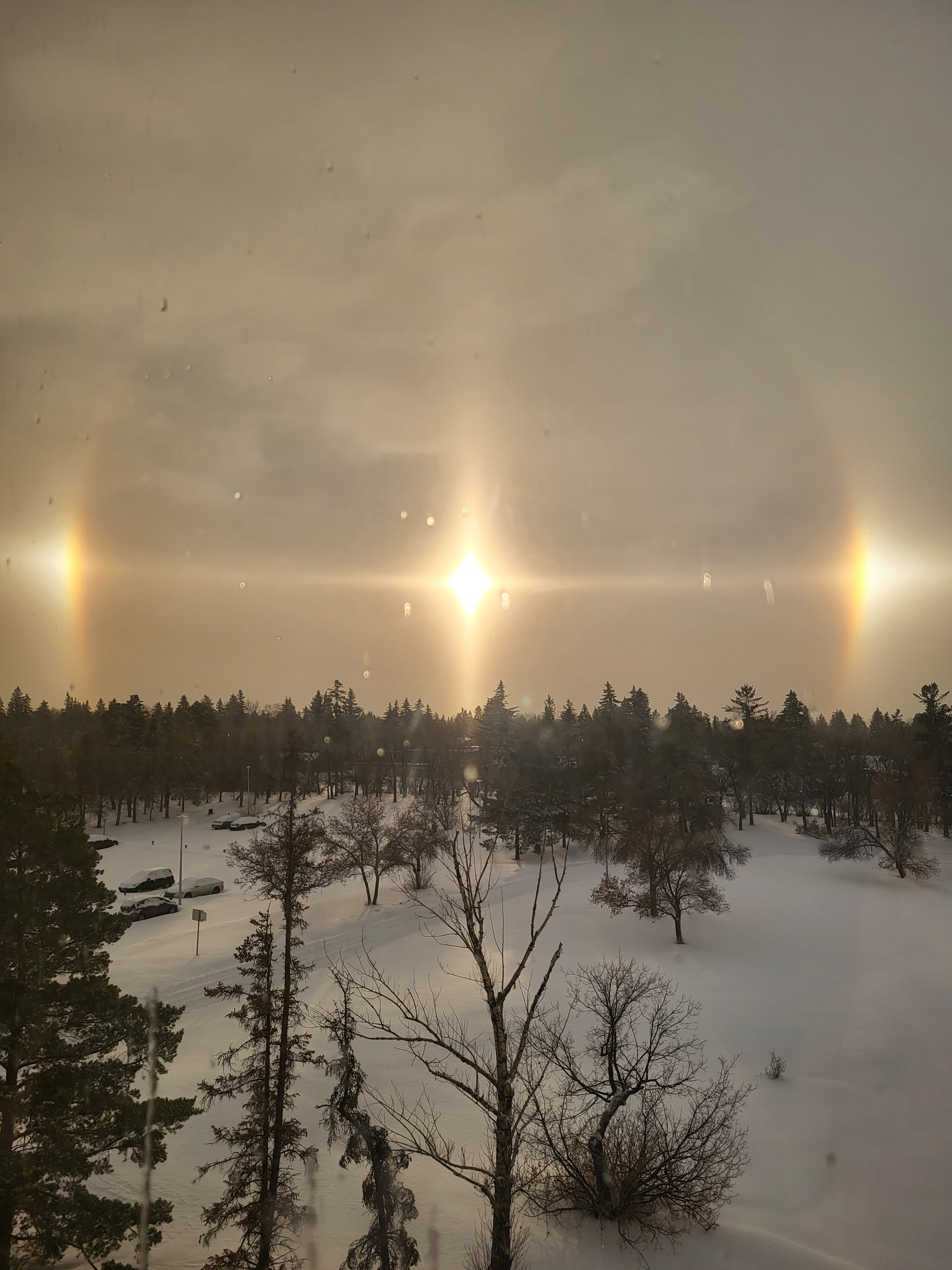
Two sun dogs along with other ice halos in Saskatoon, Canada

Sun dogs are commonly caused by the refraction and scattering of light from horizontally oriented plate-shaped hexagonal ice crystals either suspended in high and cold cirrus or cirrostratus clouds, or drifting in freezing moist air at low levels as diamond dust. The crystals act as prisms, bending the light rays passing through them with a minimum deflection of 22°. As the crystals gently float downwards with their large hexagonal faces almost horizontal, sunlight is refracted horizontally, and sun dogs are seen to the left and right of the Sun. Larger plates wobble more, and thus produce taller sun dogs.

Sun dogs are red-colored at the side nearest the Sun; farther out the colors grade through oranges to blue. The colors overlap considerably and are muted, never pure or saturated. The colors of the sun dog finally merge into the white of the parhelic circle (if the latter is visible).

The same plate-shaped ice crystals that cause sun dogs are also responsible for the colorful circumzenithal arc, meaning that these two types of halo tend to co-occur. The latter is often missed by viewers, since it is located more or less directly overhead. Another halo variety often seen together with sun dogs is the 22° halo, which forms a ring at roughly the same angular distance from the sun as the sun dogs, thus appearing to interconnect them. As the Sun rises higher, the rays passing through the plate crystals are increasingly skewed from the horizontal plane, causing their angle of deviation to increase and the sun dogs to move farther from the 22° halo, while staying at the same elevation.

It is possible to predict the forms of sun dogs as would be seen on other planets and moons. Mars might have sun dogs formed by both water-ice and CO_{2}-ice. On the giant planets—Jupiter, Saturn, Uranus, and Neptune—other crystals form clouds of ammonia, methane, and other substances that can produce halos with four or more sun dogs.

A related phenomenon, the Crown flash is also known as a "leaping Sundog".

== Terminology ==
A somewhat common misconception among the general public is to refer to any member of the ice halo family as a "sun dog" (especially the 22° halo, being one of the most common varieties). However, sun dogs represent just one of many different types of halos. For referring to the atmospheric phenomenon in general, the term (ice crystal) halo(s) is more appropriate.

== Etymology ==
The exact etymology of sun dog largely remains a mystery. The Oxford English Dictionary says it is "of obscure origin".

In Abram Palmer's 1882 book Folk-etymology: A Dictionary of Verbal Corruptions Or Words Perverted in Form Or Meaning, by False Derivation Or Mistaken Analogy, sun-dogs are defined:

The phenomena [sic] of false suns which sometimes attend or dog the true when seen through the mist (parhelions). In Norfolk a sun-dog is a light spot near the sun, and water-dogs are the light watery clouds; dog here is no doubt the same word as dag, dew or mist as "a little dag of rain" (Philolog. Soc. Trans. 1855, p. 80). Cf. Icel. dogg, Dan. and Swed. dug = Eng. "dew".

Other sources observe that Dog in English as a verb can mean "hunt, track, or follow", so Dog the true [sun] has meant track the true [sun] since the 1510s.

Alternatively, Jonas Persson suggested that out of Norse mythology and archaic names — Danish: solhunde (sun dog), Norwegian: solhund (sun dog), Swedish: solvarg (sun wolf) — in the Scandinavian languages, constellations of two wolves hunting the Sun and the Moon, one after and one before, may be a possible origin for the term.

Parhelion (plural parhelia) comes from Ancient Greek: παρήλιον (parēlion, 'beside the sun'; from παρά (para, 'beside') and ἥλιος (helios, 'sun')).

In the Anglo-Cornish dialect of Cornwall, United Kingdom, sun dogs are known as weather dogs (described as "a short segment of a rainbow seen on the horizon, foreshowing foul weather"). It is also known as a lagas in the sky which comes from the Cornish language term for the sun dog lagas awel meaning 'weather's eye' (lagas, 'eye' and awel, 'weather/wind'). This is in turn related to the Anglo-Cornish term cock's eye for a halo round the Sun or the Moon, also a portent of bad weather.

== History ==
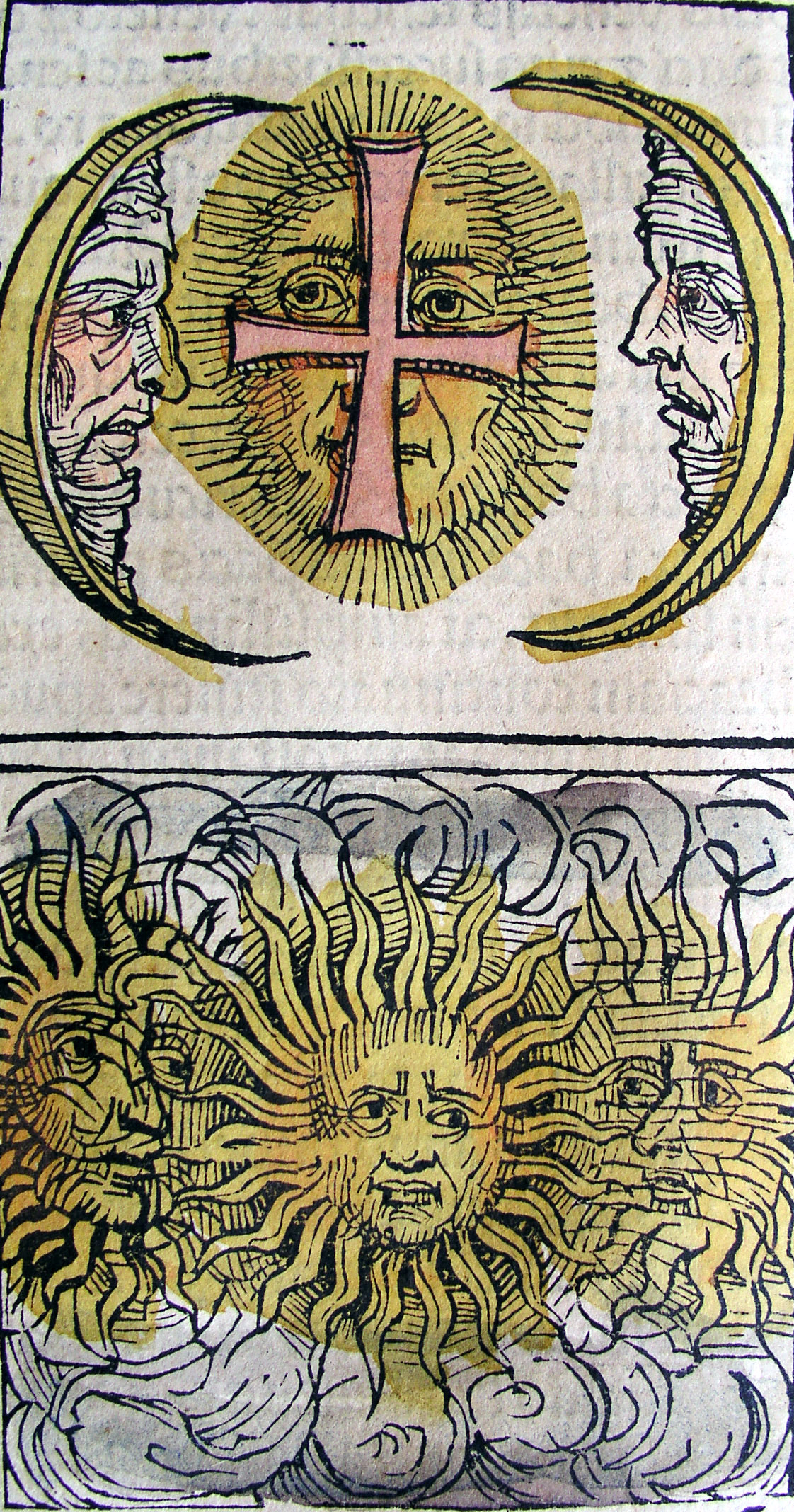
Sun dog phenomenon depicted in the Nuremberg Chronicle

=== Antiquity ===
Aristotle (Meteorology III.2, 372a14) notes that "two mock suns rose with the sun and followed it all through the day until sunset." He says that "mock suns" are always to the side, never above or below, most commonly at sunrise or sunset, more rarely in the middle of the day.

The poet Aratus (Phaenomena, lines 880–891) mentions parhelia as part of his catalogue of Weather Signs; according to him, they can indicate rain, wind, or an approaching storm.

Artemidorus in his Oneirocritica ('On the Interpretation of Dreams') included the mock suns amongst a list of celestial deities.

A passage in Cicero's On the Republic (54–51 BC) is one of many Roman authors who refer to sun dogs and similar phenomena:

... what can be the nature of the parhelion, or double sun, which was mentioned in the senate. Those that affirm they witnessed this prodigy are neither few nor unworthy of credit, so that there is more reason for investigation than incredulity.

Seneca makes an incidental reference to sun dogs in the first book of his Naturales Quaestiones.

Pliny the Elder references accounts of sun dogs in the 31st chapter of the 2nd book of his Historia Naturalis:

... many suns have been seen at the same time; not above or below the real sun, but in an oblique direction, never near nor opposite to the earth, nor in the night, but either in the east or in the west. ... We have no account transmitted to us of more than three having been seen at the same time.

The 2nd-century Roman writer and philosopher Apuleius in his Apologia says "What is the cause of the prismatic colours of the rainbow, or of the appearance in heaven of two rival images of the sun, with sundry other phenomena treated in a monumental volume by Archimedes of Syracuse."

Fulcher of Chartres, writing in Jerusalem in the early twelfth century, notes in his Historia Hierosolymitana (1127) that on February 23, 1106

... from the third hour (9 am) until midday, we saw left and right from the Sun what looked like two other Suns: they did not shine like the big one, but smaller in appearance and radiance they reddened moderately. Above their circle a halo appeared, shining very brightly, extending in its breadth as if it were some kind of city. Inside this circle a half-circle appeared, similar to a rainbow, distinct in its fourfold color, in the higher part curved towards the two aforementioned Suns, touching them in an embrace of the Sun.

=== Wars of the Roses ===
[1551] And also abowte Ester was sene in Sussex three sonnes shenynge at one tyme in the eyer, that thei cowde not dysserne wych shulde be the very sonne.

— Chronicle of the Grey Friars of London, [London] Printed for the Camden society, 1852

The prelude to the Battle of Mortimer's Cross in Herefordshire, England in 1461 is supposed to have involved the appearance of a halo display with three "suns". The Yorkist commander, later Edward IV, the king of England, convinced his initially frightened troops that it represented the three sons of the Duke of York, and Edward's troops won a decisive victory. The event was dramatized by William Shakespeare in Henry VI, Part 3, and by Sharon Kay Penman in The Sunne in Splendour.

=== Early modern era ===
Another early clear description of sun dogs is by Jacob Hutter, who wrote in his Brotherly Faithfulness: Epistles from a Time of Persecution:

My beloved children, I want to tell you that on the day after the departure of our brothers Kuntz and Michel, on a Friday, we saw three suns in the sky for a good long time, about an hour, as well as two rainbows. These had their backs turned toward each other, almost touching in the middle, and their ends pointed away from each other. And this I, Jakob, saw with my own eyes, and many brothers and sisters saw it with me. After a while the two suns and rainbows disappeared, and only the one sun remained. Even though the other two suns were not as bright as the one, they were clearly visible. I feel this was no small miracle…

The observation most likely occurred in Auspitz (Hustopeče), Moravia on 31 October 1533. The original was written in German and is from a letter originally sent in November 1533 from Auspitz in Moravia to the Adige Valley in South Tyrol. The Kuntz Maurer and Michel Schuster mentioned in the letter left Hutter on the Thursday after the feast day of Simon and Jude, which is 28 October. The Thursday after was 30 October. It is likely that the "two rainbows with their backs turned toward each other, almost touching" involved two further halo phenomena, possibly a circumzenithal arc (prone to co-occur with sun dogs) together with a partial 46° halo or supralateral arc.

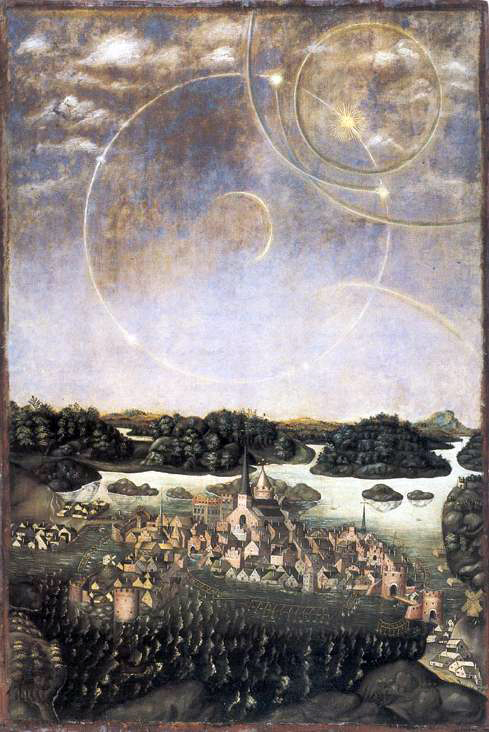
The so-called "Sun Dog Painting" (Vädersolstavlan) depicting Stockholm in 1535 and the celestial phenomenon at the time interpreted as an ominous presage

While mostly known and often quoted for being the oldest color depiction of the city of Stockholm, Vädersolstavlan (Swedish; "The Sundog Painting", literally "The Weather Sun Painting") is arguably also one of the oldest known depictions of a halo display, including a pair of sun dogs. For two hours in the morning of 20 April 1535, the skies over the city were filled with white circles and arcs crossing the sky, while additional suns (i.e., sun dogs) appeared around the sun. The phenomenon quickly resulted in rumours of an omen of God's forthcoming revenge on King Gustav Vasa (1496–1560) for having introduced Protestantism during the 1520s and for being heavy-handed with his enemies allied with the Danish king.

Hoping to end speculations, the Chancellor Olaus Petri (1493–1552), a Lutheran scholar, ordered a painting to be produced documenting the event. When confronted with the painting, the King, however, interpreted it as a conspiracy — the real sun, of course, being himself —threatened by competing fake suns, one being Olaus Petri and the other the clergyman and scholar Laurentius Andreae (1470–1552). Both were thus accused of treachery, but eventually escaped capital punishment. The original painting is lost, but a copy from the 1630s survives and can still be seen in the church Storkyrkan in central Stockholm.

In 1629, Pierre Gassendi observed and correctly explained the parhelia phenomenon in terms of the reflection of sunlight by ice or snow crystals at high altitude. A series of complex parhelia displays in Rome in 1629, and again in 1630, were described by Christoph Scheiner in his book Parhelia, one of the earliest works on the subject. It had a profound effect, causing René Descartes to interrupt his metaphysical studies and led to his work of natural philosophy called The World.

On 20 February 1661 the people of Gdańsk witnessed a complex halo display, described by Georg Fehlau in a pamphlet, the Sevenfold Sun Miracle, and again the following year by Johannes Hevelius in his book, Mercurius in Sole visus Gedani.

On 18 June 1790 Johann Tobias Lowitz, in Saint Petersburg, Russia, observed a complex display of haloes and parhelia which included his Lowitz arcs.

=== Late modern era ===
In 1843, winter in the British Colony of Newfoundland was referred to as the 'Winter of Three Suns' and was unusually cold with 15 days of temperatures between 3–10 degrees below zero.

"Part of the time we marched in the teeth of a biting storm of snow, and at every hour of the day the sun could be discerned sulking behind soft grey mists in company with rivals, known in the language of the plains as 'Sun-dogs', whose parahelic splendors warned the traveler of the approach of the ever-to-be-dreaded 'blizzard'."

On 14 February 2020, people in Inner Mongolia witnessed a different complex halo display called the Five-fold sun miracle, in which all five sun halos were linked to each other by rays, forming a circle among them.

== See also ==
- Anthelion
- Circumhorizontal arc
- Corona (optical phenomenon)
- Crown flash
- Liljequist parhelion
- Moon dog
