= 120° parhelion =

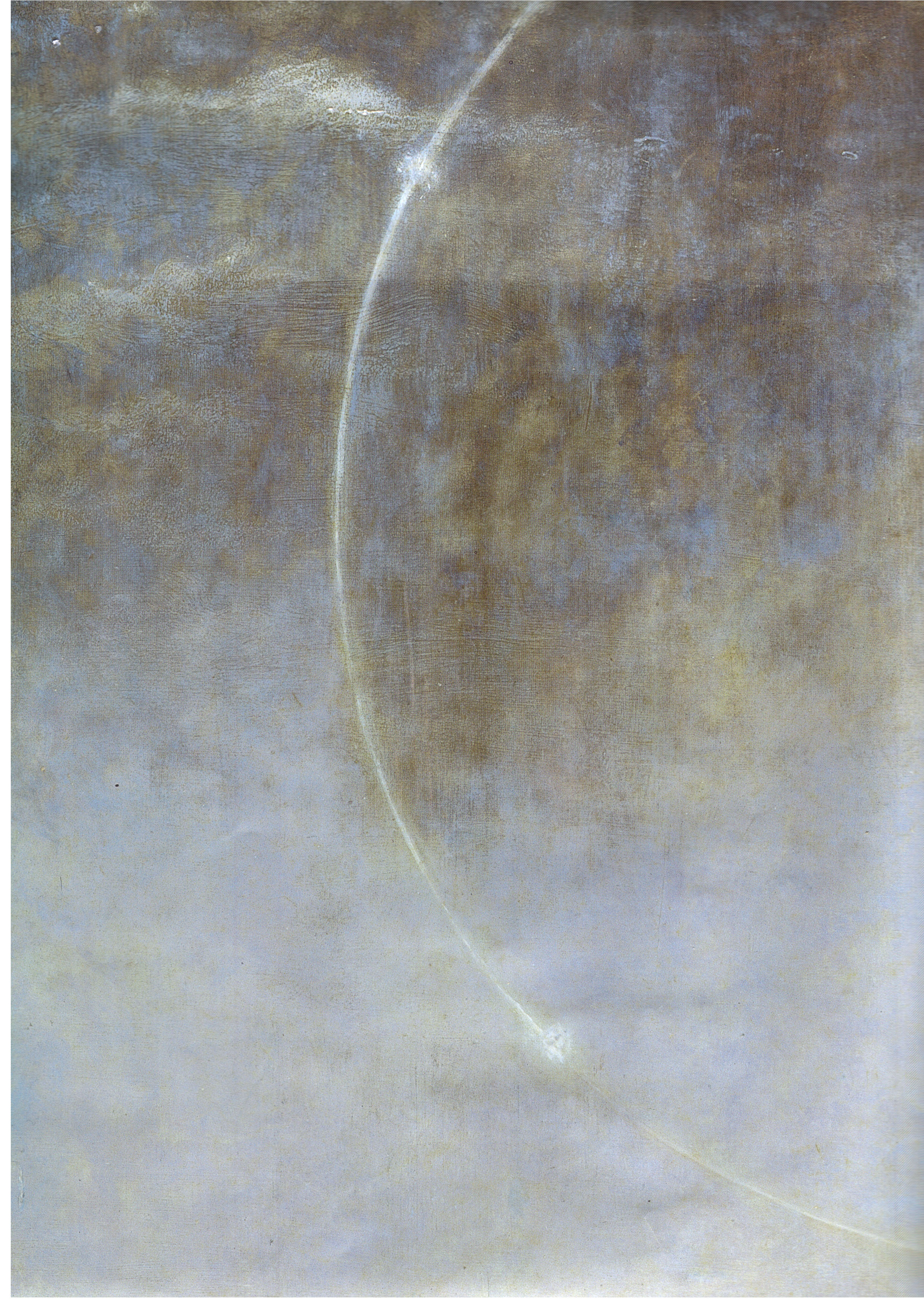
A 120° parhelion (upper spot) depicted in the painting Vädersolstavlan.

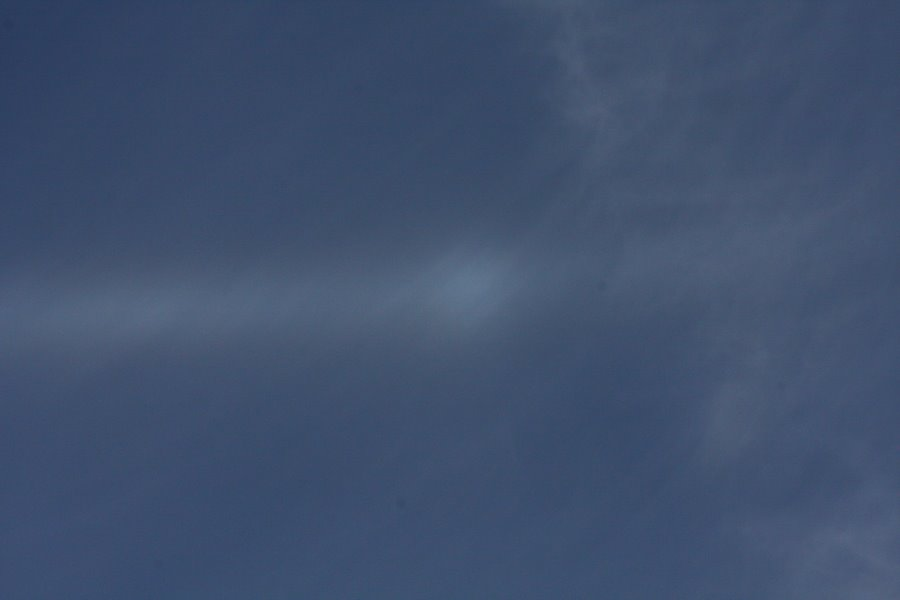
Faint 120° parhelion on the parhelic circle.

A 120° parhelion (plural: 120° parhelia) is a relatively rare halo, an optical phenomenon occasionally appearing along with very bright sun dogs (also called parhelia) when ice crystal-saturated cirrus clouds fill the atmosphere. The 120° parhelia are named for appearing in pair on the parhelic circle ±120° from the sun.

When visible, 120° parhelia appear as white-bluish bright spots on the white parhelic circle and are the product of at least two interior reflections in the hexagonal ice crystals. Their colour together with them being rather obscure can make observing them difficult as they tend to fuse with the clouds in the sky.

== See also ==
- Liljequist parhelion
- Subhelic arc
