= Gösta Hjalmar Liljequist =

Swedish meteorologist

Gösta Hjalmar Liljequist (1914–1995) was a Swedish meteorologist.

In Sweden, radio broadcast weather forecasts begun in 1926, and, starting in 1941, Liljequist was one of the recurrent meteorologists appearing in Swedish radio for many years. Following his debut, his peculiar dialect caused mass protests which, together with an attack published by the humorist Kar de Mumma in the paper Svenska Dagbladet, caused broadcast forecasts to be taken over by Swedish public service radio during the war.

After the war, Liljequist took part in the Norwegian-British-Swedish Antarctic Expedition (NBSAE) (1949-1952). During the expedition he became the first to observe a rare type of halo, an optical phenomenon subsequently named Liljequist parhelia after him.

During his life Liljequist wrote several books related to his field, besides textbooks on climatology and meteorology also overviews of Swedish polar history and research.

== Bibliography ==
- Arktisk utpost: Berättelsen om den svensk-finsk-schweiziska expeditionen till Nordostlandet 1957-1958, 1960
- Antarctica, 1960 (together with Emil Schulthess)
- Meteorologi, 1962
- Klimatologi, 1970
- Jordens klimat, 1975
- Moln - deras uppkomst och formationer, 1979
- Sweden and Antarctica, 1985
- High Latitudes - A History of Swedish Polar Travels and Research 1758-1980, 1993
