= Parhelic circle =

Type of halo, an optical phenomenon

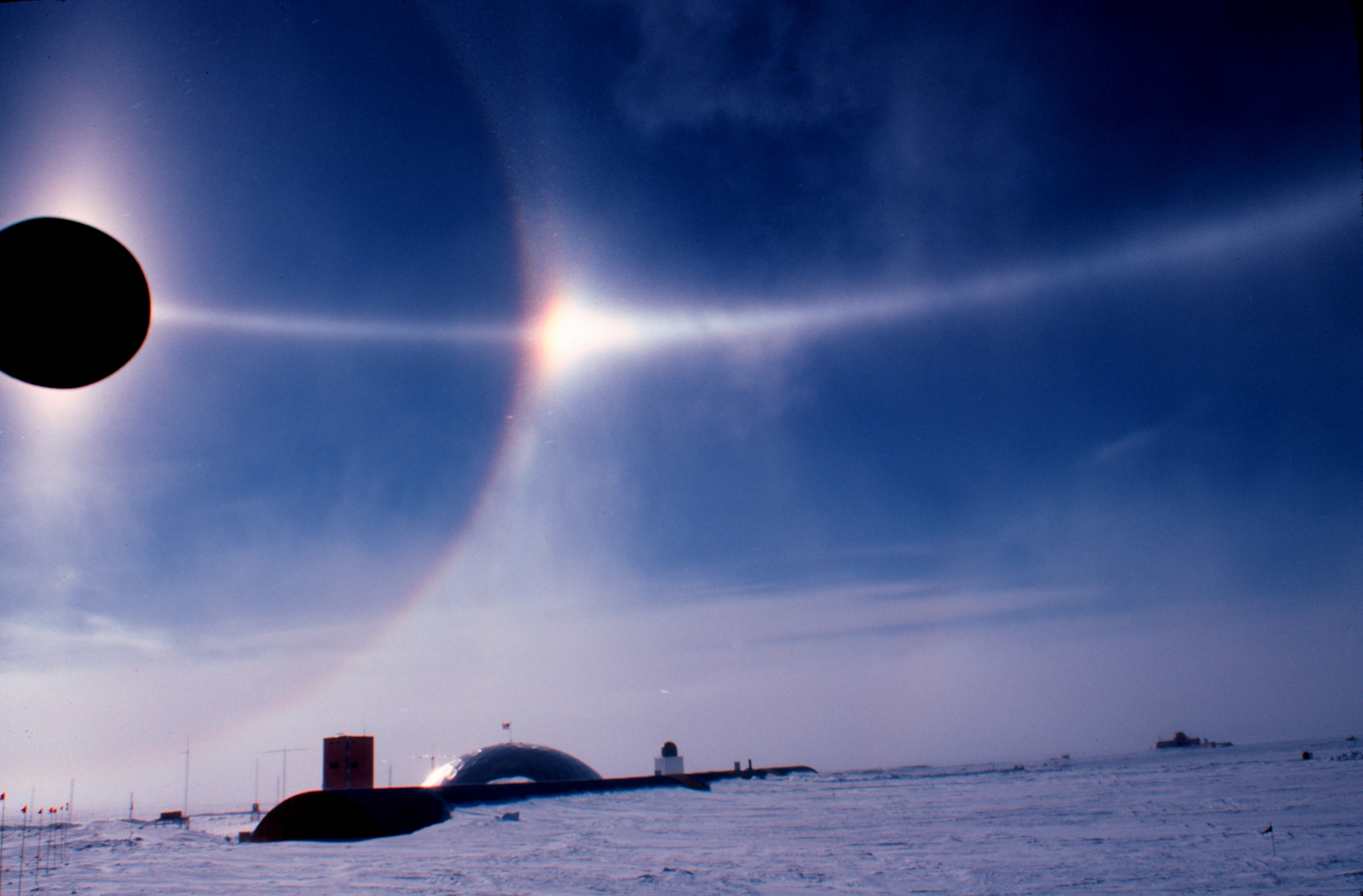
A crisp parhelic circle (horizontal line) over South Pole Station. Note that this image does not depict a solar eclipse and the sun was probably occluded by a device to protect the camera. Photo: John Bortniak, NOAA, January 1979.

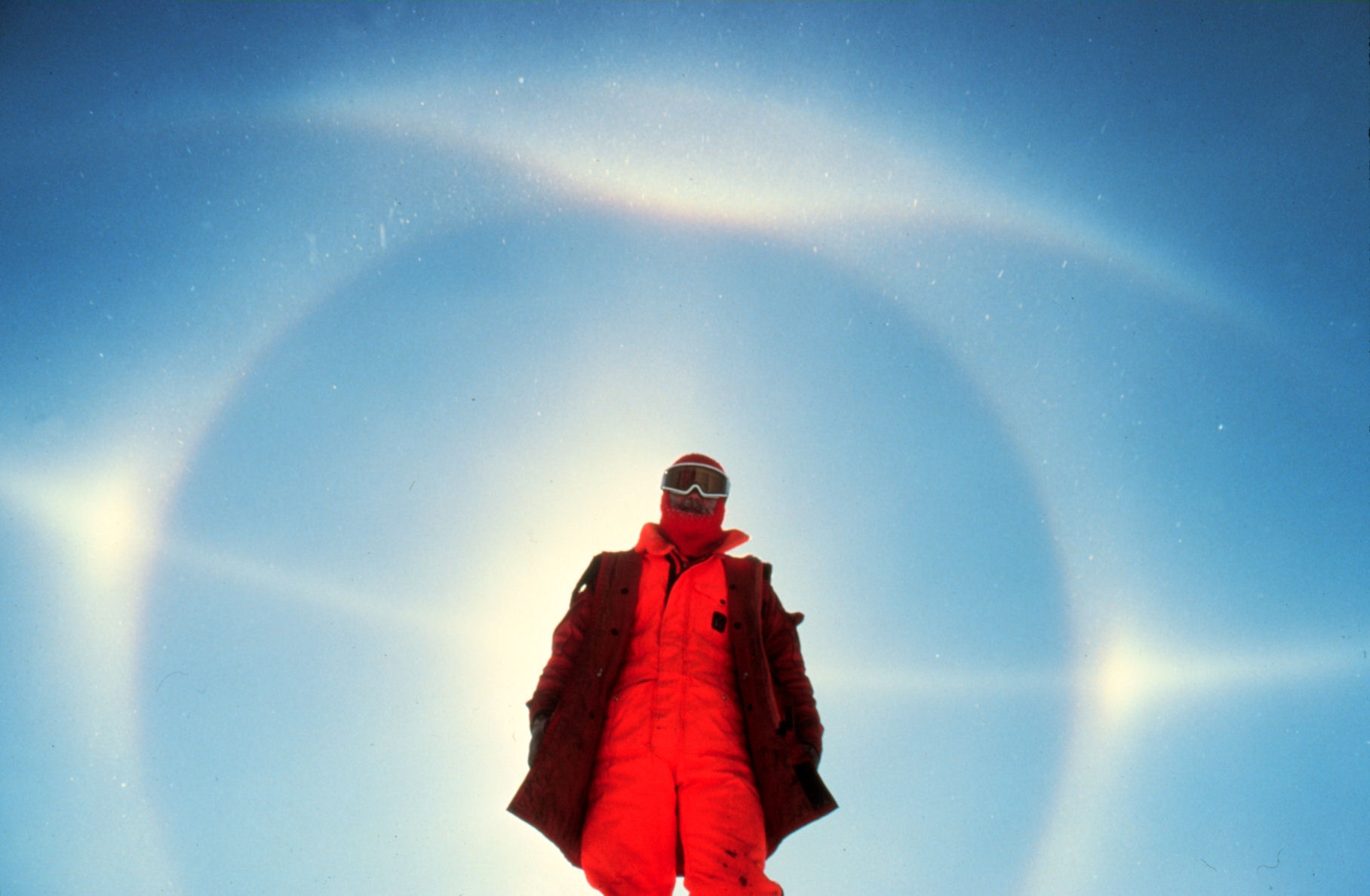
A halo display observed over the South Pole. Featured in the photo are several distinct phenomena: A parhelic circle (horizontal line), a 22° halo (circle) with two sundogs (bright spots), a Parry arc, and an upper tangent arc. Photo: Cindy McFee, NOAA, December 1980.

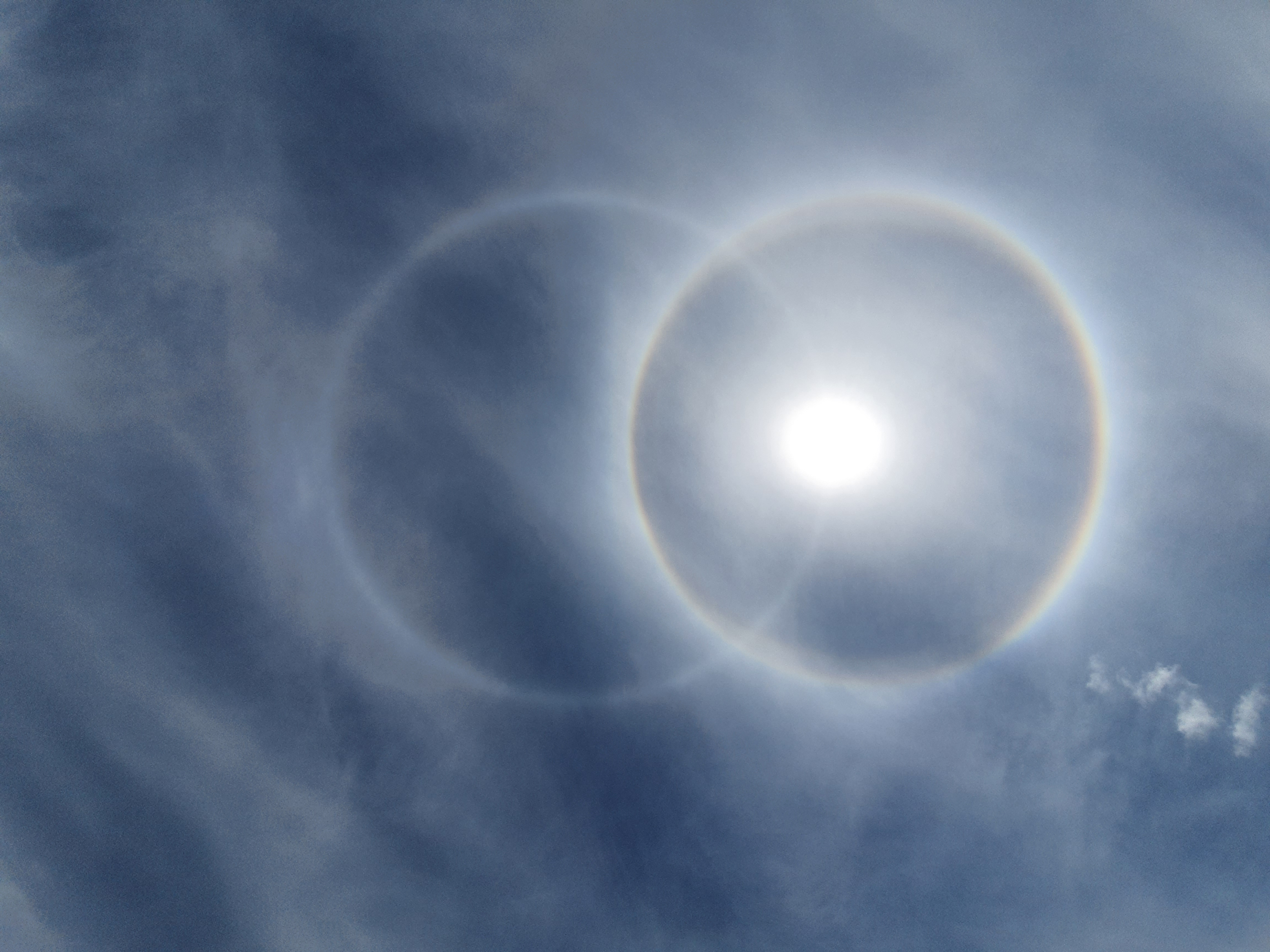
22° sun halo with a complete parhelic circle. Photo is taken with Samsung S10 phone (wide lens) near Zazid, Slovenia, on May 19th, 2023.

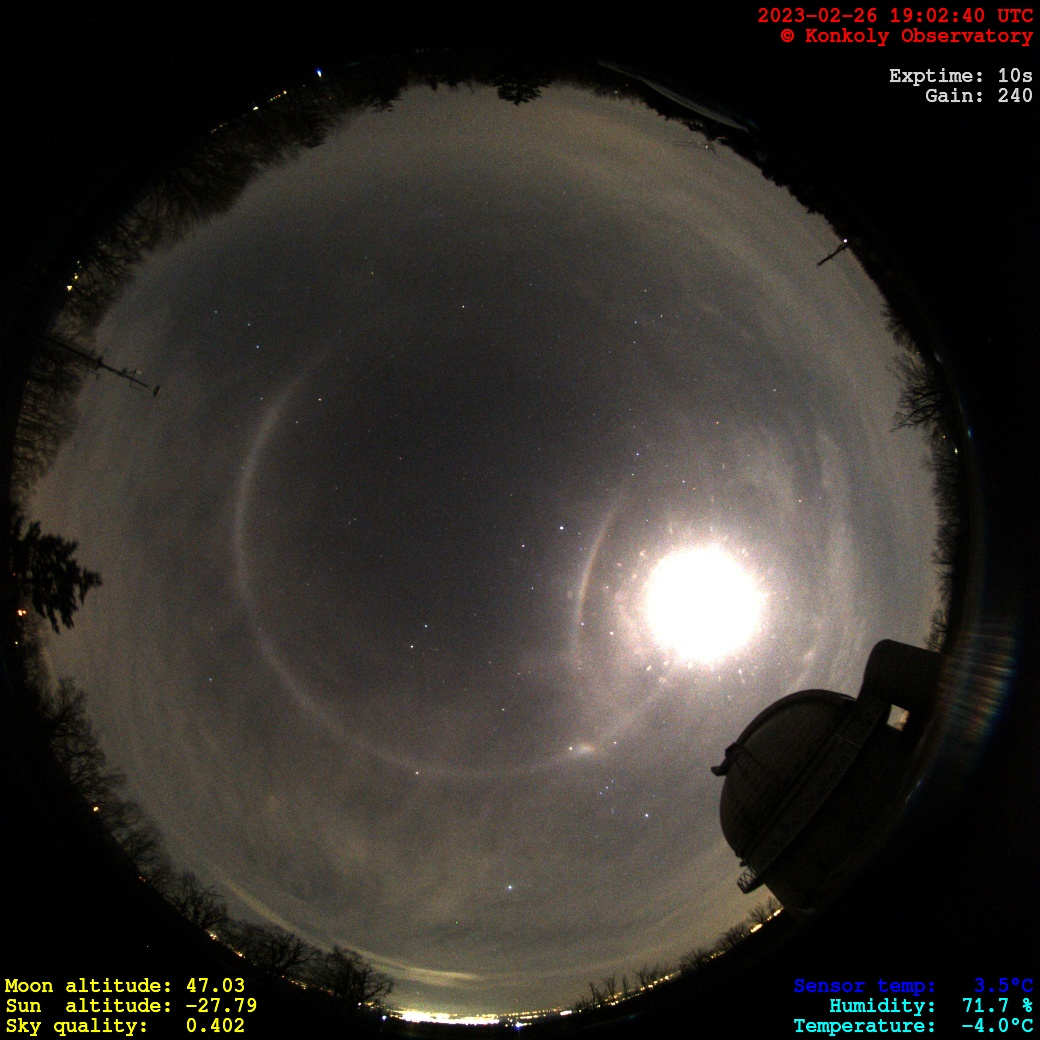
A nearly complete paraselenic circle, along with a partial 22° lunar halo and the eastern moon dog. Photo is taken by the all-sky camera of the Piszkéstető Mountain Station, Konkoly Observatory (Hungary), February 2023.

A parhelic circle is a type of halo, an optical phenomenon appearing as a horizontal white line on the same altitude as the Sun, or occasionally the Moon. If complete, it stretches all around the sky, but more commonly it only appears in sections. If the halo occurs due to light from the Moon rather than the Sun, it is known as a paraselenic circle.

Even fractions of parhelic circles are less common than sun dogs and 22° halos. While parhelic circles are generally white in colour because they are produced by reflection, they can however show a bluish or greenish tone near the 120° parhelia and be reddish or deep violet along the fringes.

Parhelic circles form as beams of sunlight are reflected by vertical or almost vertical hexagonal ice crystals. The reflection can be either external (e.g. without the light passing through the crystal) which contributes to the parhelic circle near the Sun, or internal (one or more reflections inside the crystal) which creates much of the circle away from the Sun. Because an increasing number of reflections makes refraction asymmetric some colour separation occurs away from the Sun. Sun dogs are always aligned to the parhelic circle (but not always to the 22° halo).

The intensity distribution of the parhelic circle is largely dominated by 1-3-2 and 1-3-8-2 rays (cf. the nomenclature by W. Tape, i.e. 1 denotes the top hexagonal face, 2 the bottom face, and 3-8 enumerate the side faces in counter-clockwise fashion. A ray is notated by the sequence in which it encounters the prism faces). The former ray-path is responsible for the blue spot halo which occurs at an azimuth.

$\theta_{\mathfrak{1}\mathfrak{3}\mathfrak{2}}=2\arcsin\left(n\cos\left(\arcsin\left(1/n\right)\right)/\cos\left(e\right)\right)$,

with $n$ being the material's index of refraction (not the Bravais index of refraction for inclined rays). However, many more features give a structure to the intensity pattern of the parhelic circle. Among the features of the parhelic circle are the Liljequist parhelia, the 90° parhelia (likely unobservable), the second order 90° parhelia (unobservable), the 22° parhelia and more.

Artificial parhelic circles can be realized by experimental means using, for instance, spinning crystals.

== See also ==
- Upper and lower tangent arcs
- Circumzenithal arc
- Liljequist parhelion
