= Lowitz arc =

Optical phenomenon

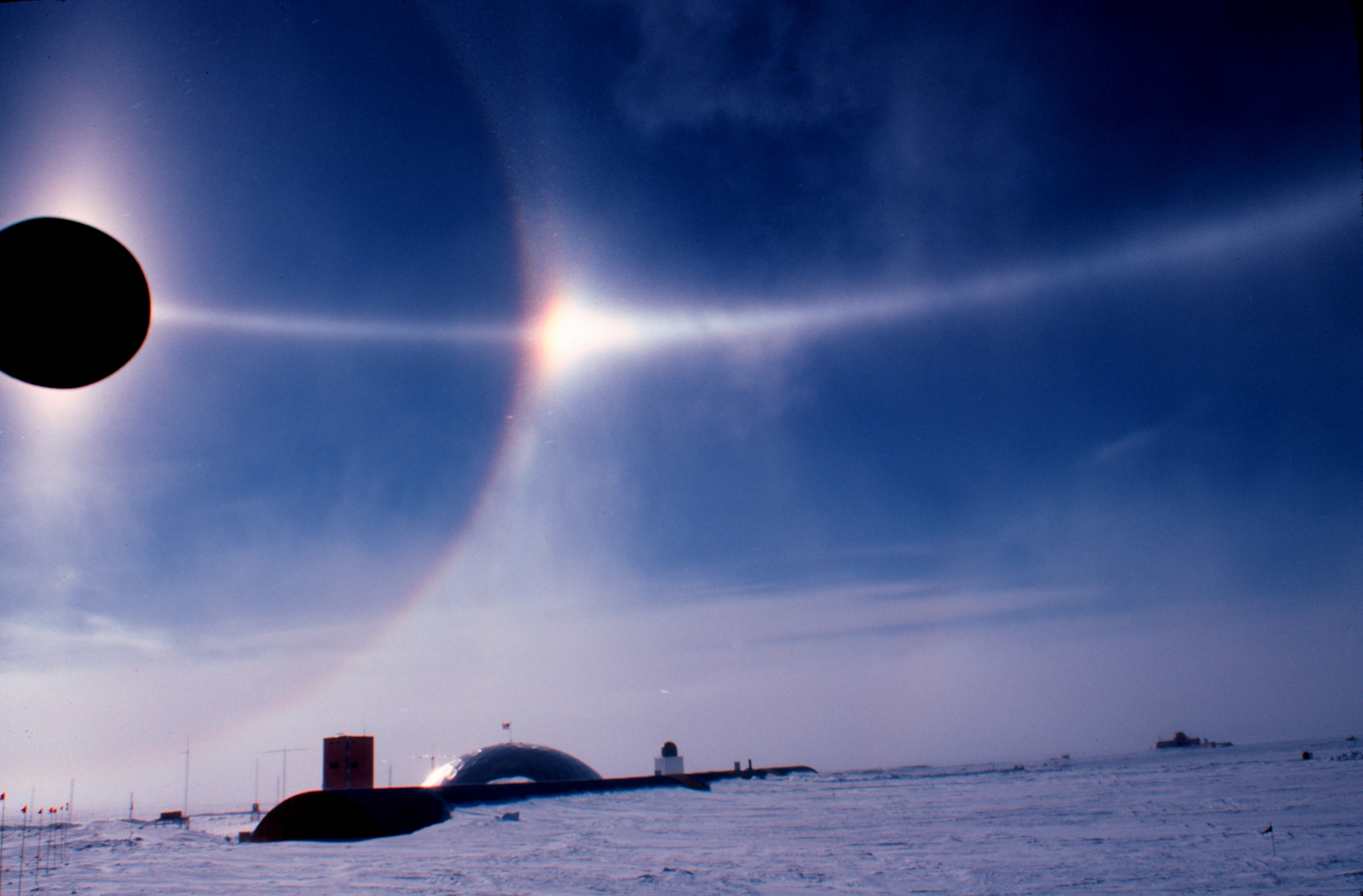
Faintly visible lines going up and down from the sun dog are most likely Lowitz arcs

A Lowitz arc is an optical phenomenon that occurs in the atmosphere; specifically, it is a rare type of ice crystal halo that forms a luminous arc which extends inwards from a sun dog (parhelion) and may continue above or below the sun.

== History ==
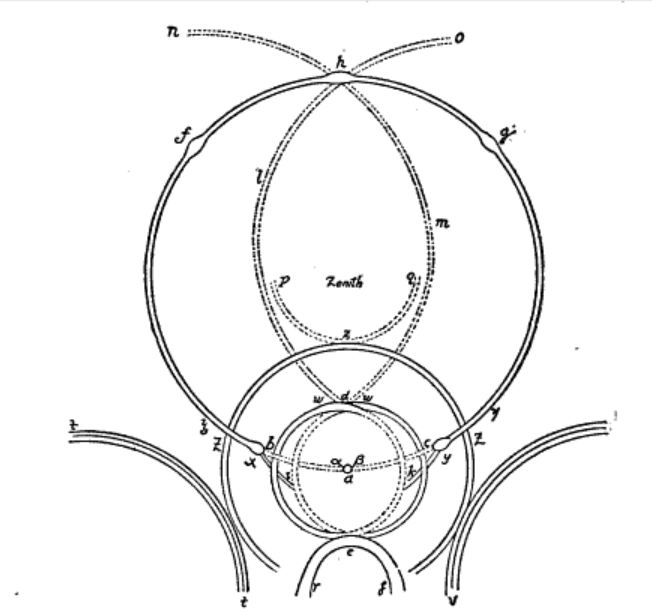
Lowitz's diagram of solar halos (1790). The Sun (labeled αβa) lies within the two overlapping circles near the bottom of the image. Sun dogs (labeled bx and cy) lie to the Sun's left and right. The "Lowitz arcs" (labeled xi and yk) descend at an acute angle from the sun dogs and intersect the circles that surround the Sun.

The phenomenon is named after Johann Tobias Lowitz (or Lovits) (1757 - 1804), a German-born Russian apothecary and experimental chemist. On the morning of June 18, 1790 in St. Petersburg, Russia, Lowitz witnessed a spectacular display of solar halos. Among his observations, he noted arcs descending from the sun dogs and extending below the sun:

Original (in French): 6. Ces deux derniers parhélies qui se trouvoient à quelque distance des intersections du grand cercle horizontal par les deux couronnes qui entourent le soleil, renvoyoient d'abord des deux cotés de parties d'arc très courtes colorées xi & yk dont la direction s'inclinoit au dessous du soleil jusqu'aux deux demi-arcs de cercle intérieurs die & dke. En second lieu ils étoient pourvues des queues longues, claires & blanches x ζ & y η, opposées au soleil & renfermées dans la circonference du grand cercle afbg.

Translation : 6. These last two parhelia which were at some distance from the intersections of the great horizontal circle by the two coronas which surrounded the sun, sent, in the first place, from the two sides very short colored arcs xi & yk whose direction inclined below the sun as far as the two interior semicircular arcs die & dke. In the second place, they had long tails, bright and white x ζ & y η, directed away from the sun and included in the circumference of the great circle afhg.

Lowitz formally reported the phenomenon to the St. Petersburg Academy of Sciences on October 18, 1790, including a detailed illustration of what he had witnessed. The illustration included what are now called “lower Lowitz arcs”.

However, some scientists (not unreasonably) doubted the existence of the phenomenon: the phenomenon rarely occurs; and since Lowitz arcs were little known, people who witnessed them didn’t always recognize them; furthermore, until the advent of small, inexpensive digital cameras, witnesses rarely had, at hand, cameras to record them, and even if they did have cameras, the cameras weren’t always sensitive enough to record the faint Lowitz arcs. Only since circa 1990 have photographs of what are clearly Lowitz arcs become available for study and analysis.

== The phenomenon and hypotheses about its cause ==
Sometimes, when the sun is low in the sky, there are luminous spots to the left and right of the sun and at the same elevation as the sun. These luminous spots are called "sun dogs" or "parhelia". (Often on these occasions, the sun is also surrounded by a luminous ring or halo, the angle between the sun and the halo (with the observer at the angle’s vertex) measuring 22°.) On rare occasions, faint arcs extend upwards or downwards from these sun dogs. These arcs extending from the sun dogs are "Lowitz arcs". As many as three distinct arcs may extend from the sun dogs. The short arc that first inclines towards the sun and then extends downward is called the "lower Lowitz arc". A longer second arc may also extend downward from the sun dog but then curve under the sun, perhaps joining the other sun dog; this is the "middle Lowitz arc" or "circular Lowitz arc". Finally, a third arc may extend upwards from the sun dog; this is the "upper Lowitz arc". In his diagram of 1790, Lowitz recorded only a lower Lowitz arc.

Like the 22° solar halo and sun dogs, Lowitz arcs are believed to be caused by sunlight refracting (bending) through ice crystals. However, there still remains some dispute about the shape and orientation of the ice crystals that produce Lowitz arcs.

In 1840, the German astronomer Johann Gottfried Galle (1812 - 1910) proposed that lower Lowitz arcs were produced as sun dogs are; that is, by sunlight refracting through hexagonal ice crystals. However, in the case of sun dogs, the columnar crystals are oriented vertically, whereas in the case of Lowitz arcs, Galle proposed, the crystals oscillated about their vertical axes.

Charles Sheldon Hastings (1848 - 1932), an American physicist who specialized in optics, suggested in 1901 that Lowitz arcs were due to hexagonal plates of ice, which oscillated around a horizontal axis in the plane of the plate as the plate fell, similar to the fluttering of a falling leaf. Later, in 1920, he proposed that the plates rotate, rather than merely oscillate, around their long diagonals.

According to Hastings, sunlight enters one of the faces on the edge of the plate, is refracted, propagates through the ice crystal, and then exits through another face on the edge of the plate, which is at 60° to the first face, refracts again as it exits, and finally reaches the observer. Because the ice plates rotate, plates throughout an arc are—at some time during each rotation—oriented to refract sunlight to the observer. A hexagonal plate has three long diagonals about which it can rotate, but rotation around only one of the axes causes the lower Lowitz arc. The other Lowitz arcs—the middle and upper arcs—are caused by sunlight passing through the two other pairs of faces of the hexagonal ice plate.

However, since circa 1990, photographs of what are clearly Lowitz arcs have become available for study. Furthermore, numerical ray-tracing software allows Lowitz arcs to be simulated by computers, so that, from hypotheses about the shape and orientation of ice crystals, the shape and intensity of a hypothetical Lowitz arc can be predicted and compared against photographs of actual arcs. As a result of such simulations, the traditional explanation of Lowitz arcs has been found to have some shortcomings. Specifically, simulations assuming that only perfectly hexagonal, rotating plates produce Lowitz arcs, predict the wrong intensities for the arcs. More accurate simulations were obtained by assuming that the plates were almost horizontal, or that the ice crystals had a more rhombic shape or were hexagonal columns that were oriented horizontally.

Hence the exact mechanism by which Lowitz arcs are produced, remains unresolved.
