= Johann Tobias Lowitz =

German chemist (1757–1804)

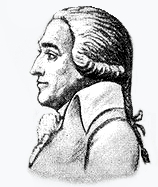

Johann Tobias Lowitz (Russian: Товий Егорович Ловиц, romanized: Tovy Yegorovich Lovits; 25 April 1757 – 7 December 1804) was a German-Russian chemist and pharmacist. He was among the first to observe the clarification of liquids through the use of charcoal for adsorption and to apply this process in various applications.

== Biography ==
Lowitz was born in Göttingen to the mathematician and cartographer Georg Moritz Lowitz (1722–74) and Dorothea née Riepenhausen (1723–65). In 1767 he moved to St Petersburg along with his father and joined the expedition to the Caspian region during which he and his father were captured by a band of rebels who hanged his father. Lowitz escaped and after returning, studied at the St. Petersburg Gymnasium and became an assistant at the court pharmacy. He went to Göttingen to study pharmacy in 1780. In 1783, he began his return journey on foot to St. Petersburg, where he resumed work at the court pharmacy in 1784. He conducted experiments in chemistry and in 1785 he developed methods to produce pure tartaric acid using charcoal. He examined the use of charcoal for purification of water. He supported the phlogiston theory. He examined crystallization from supersaturated and supercooled solutions, noting the application of seed crystals. In 1787 he replaced Mikhail Lomonosov at the Imperial Academy of Sciences and in 1793 he became professor of chemistry.

Lowitz described halos or arcs around the sun which are tangential to the 22° halo and curve outwards on either side of it. These have been terms as Lowitz arcs, the optical mechanics of its formation are debated.
