= Optical phenomenon =

Observable events that result from the interaction of light and matter

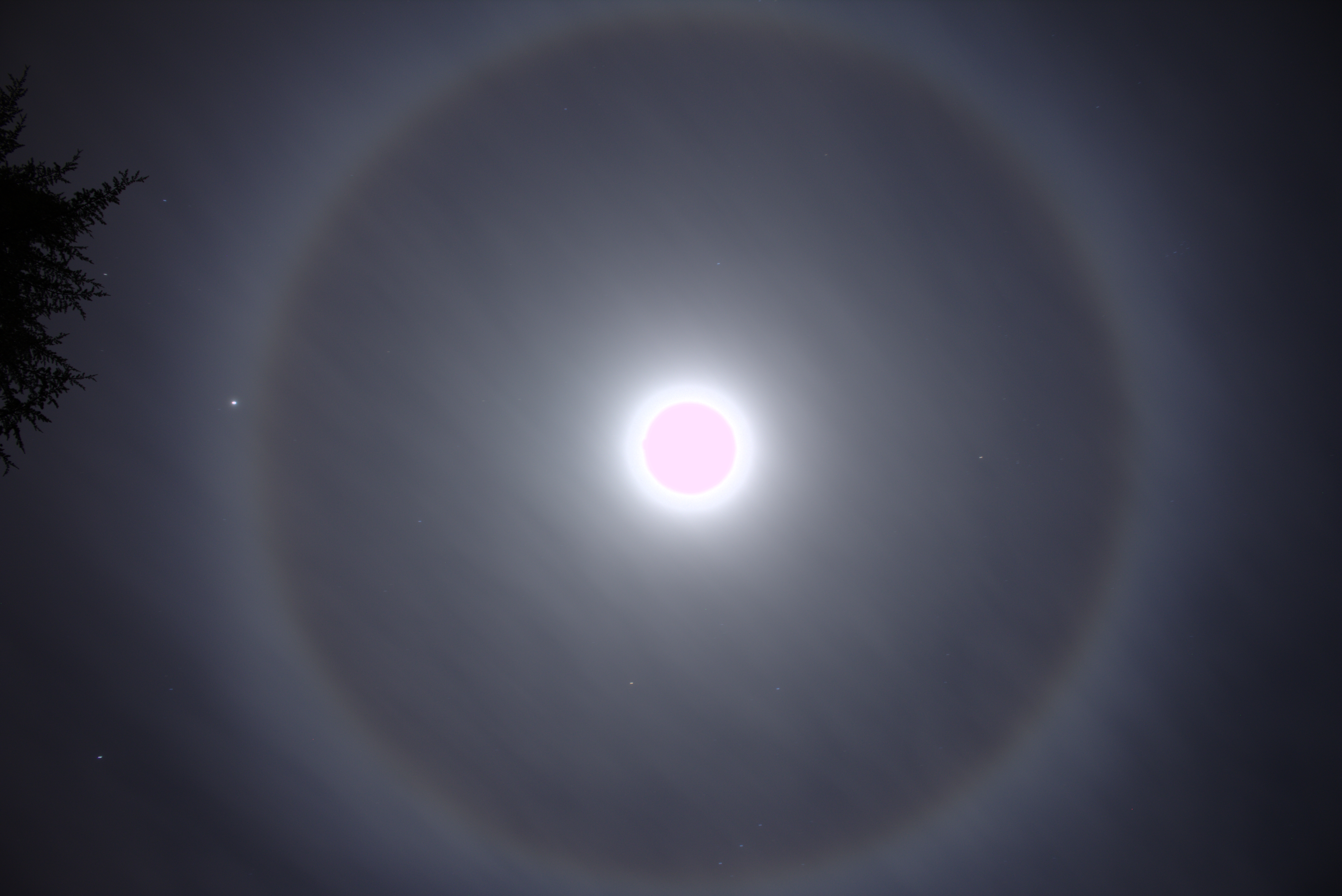
A 22° halo around the Moon in Atherton, California

Optical phenomena are any observable events that result from the interaction of light and matter.

All optical phenomena coincide with quantum phenomena. Common optical phenomena are often due to the interaction of light from the Sun or Moon with the atmosphere, clouds, water, dust, and other particulates. One common example is the rainbow, when light from the Sun is reflected and refracted by water droplets. Some phenomena, such as the green ray, are so rare they are sometimes thought to be mythical. Others, such as Fata Morganas, are commonplace in favored locations.

Other phenomena are simply interesting aspects of optics, or optical effects. For instance, the colors generated by a prism are often shown in classrooms.

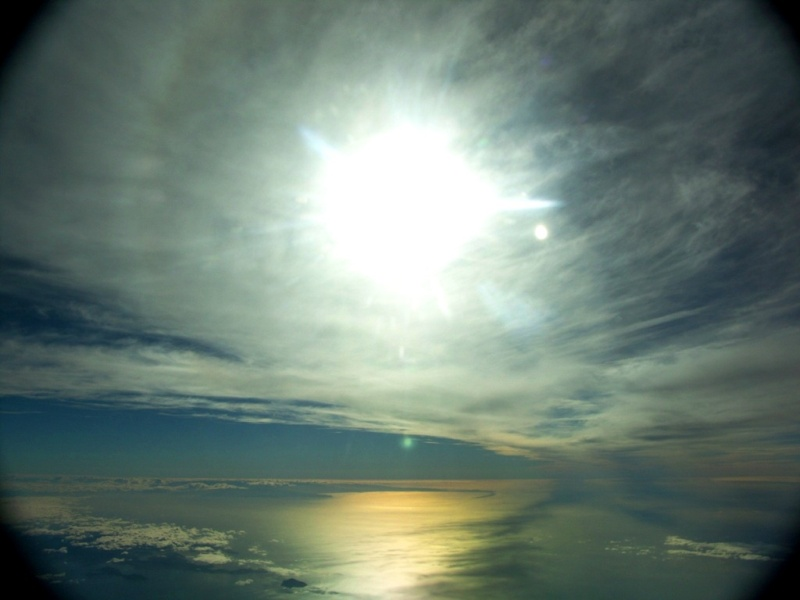
A solar halo as seen from 41° south latitude

== Scope ==
Optical phenomena encompass a broad range of events, including those caused by atmospheric optical properties, other natural occurrences, man-made effects, and interactions involving human vision (entoptic phenomena). Also listed here are unexplained phenomena that could have an optical explanation and "optical illusions" for which optical explanations have been excluded.

There are multiple phenomena that result from either the particle or the wave nature of light. Some are quite subtle and observable only by precise measurement using scientific instruments. A famous example is the bending of starlight by the Sun during a solar eclipse, a phenomenon that serves as evidence for the curvature of space as predicted by the theory of relativity.

== Atmospheric optical phenomena ==
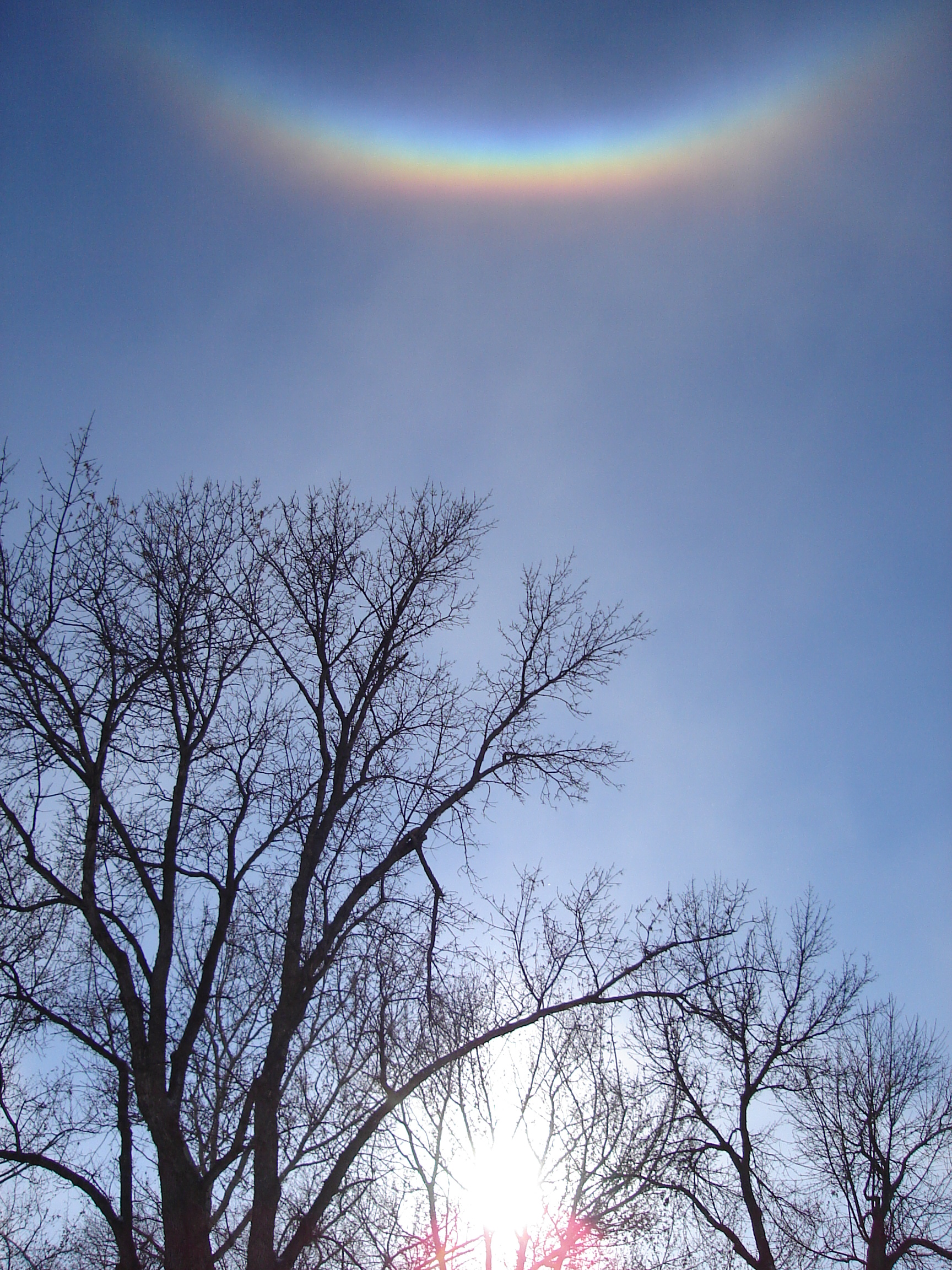
A circumzenithal arc over Grand Forks, North Dakota

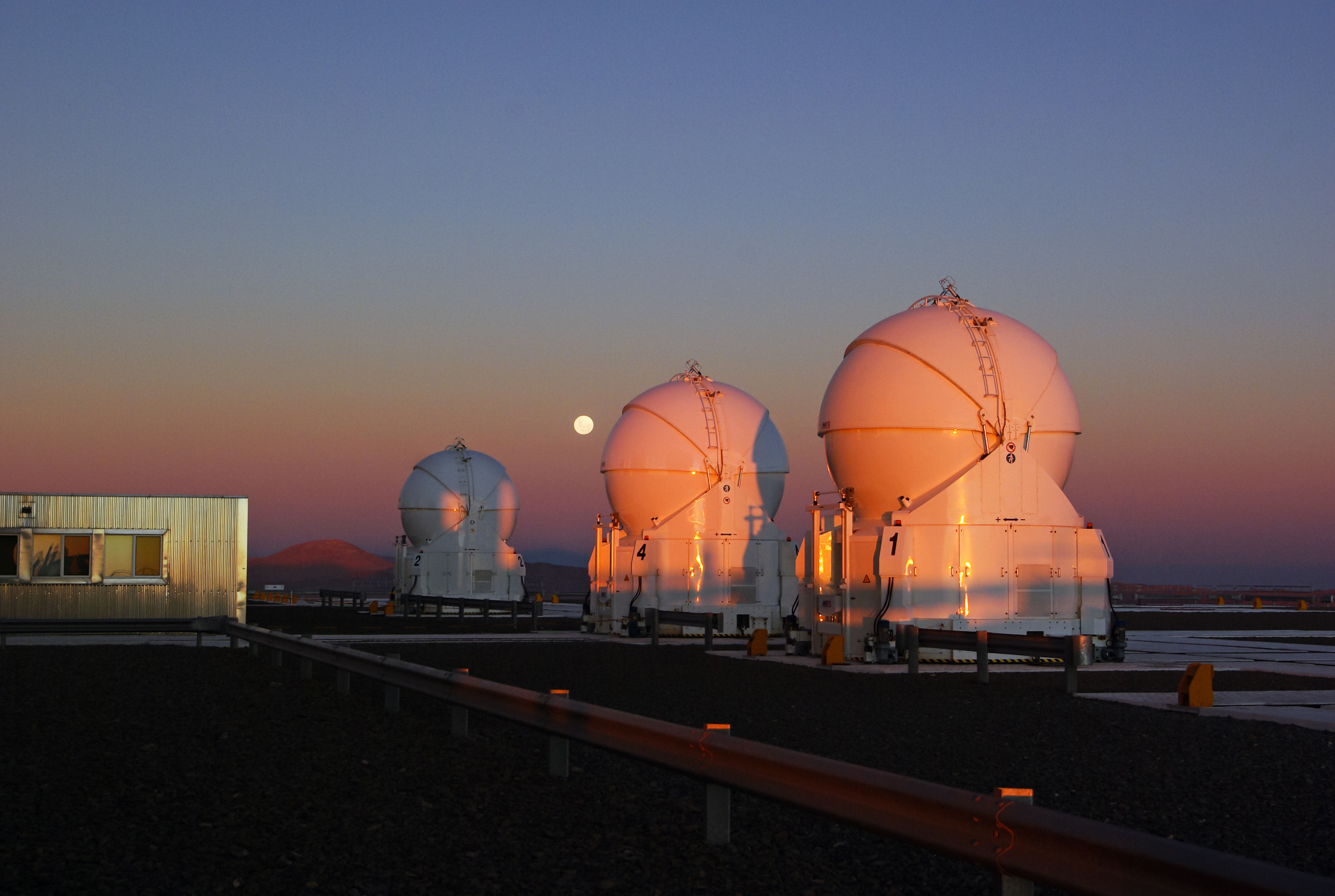
The Belt of Venus over Paranal Observatory atop Cerro Paranal in the Atacama Desert, northern Chile

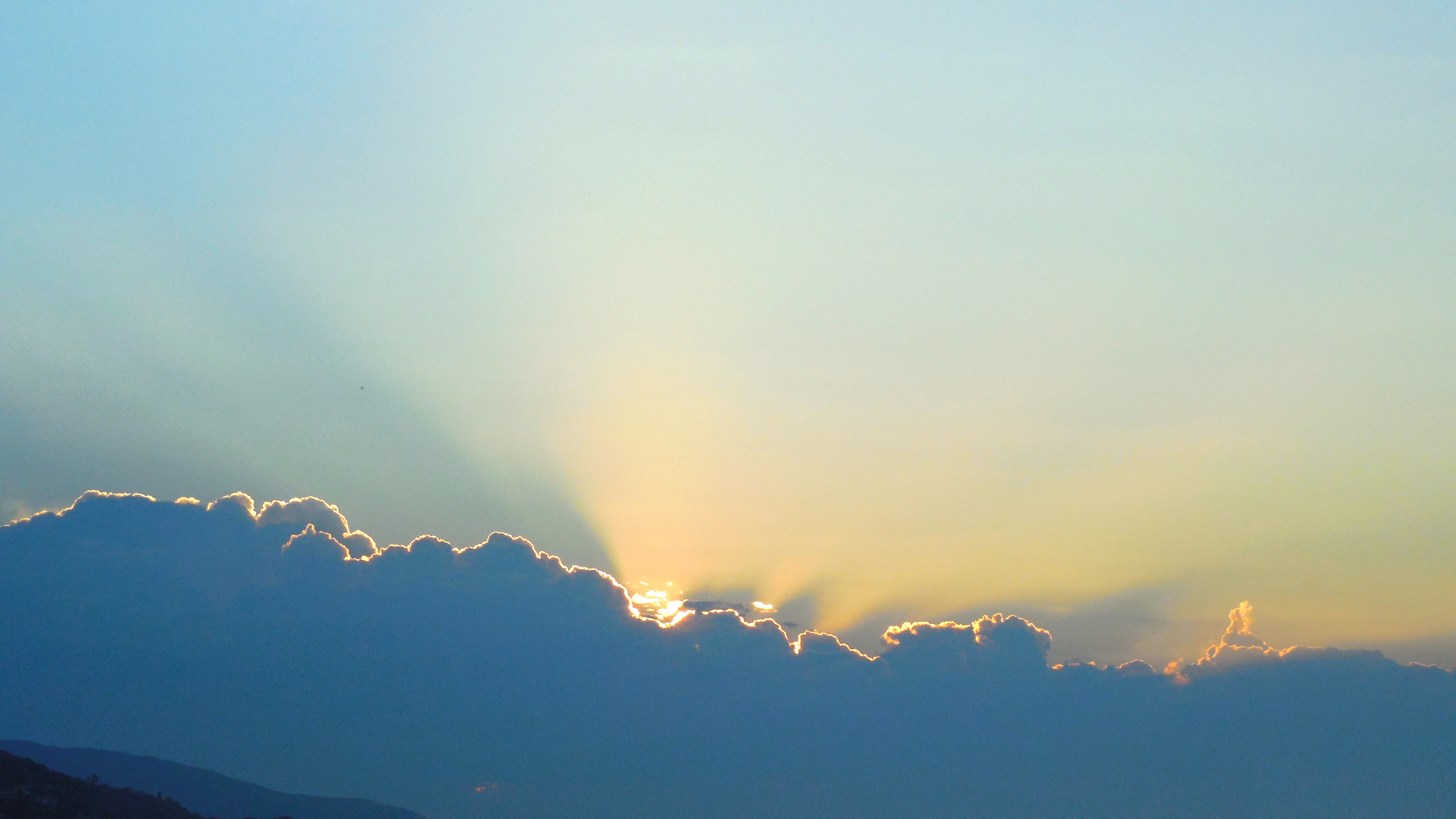
Crepuscular rays at sunrise in Malibu, California

Atmospheric optical phenomena include:

- Afterglow
- Airglow
- Alexander's band, the dark region between the two bows of a double rainbow.
- Alpenglow
- Anthelion
- Anticrepuscular rays
- Aurora (northern and southern lights, aurora borealis and aurora australis)
- Belt of Venus
- Brocken Spectre
- Circumhorizontal arc
- Circumzenithal arc
- Cloud iridescence
- Crepuscular rays
- Earth's shadow
- Earthquake lights
- Glories
- Green flash
- Halos, of Sun or Moon, including sun dogs
- Haze
- Heiligenschein or halo effect, partly caused by the opposition effect
- Ice blink
- Light pillar
- Lightning
- Mirages (including Fata Morgana)
- Monochrome Rainbow
- Moon dog
- Moonbow
- Nacreous cloud/Polar stratospheric cloud
- Rainbow
- Sprite (lightning)
- STEVE
- Subsun
- Sun dog
- Tangent arc
- Tyndall effect
- Upper-atmospheric lightning, including red sprites, Blue jets, and ELVES
- Water sky

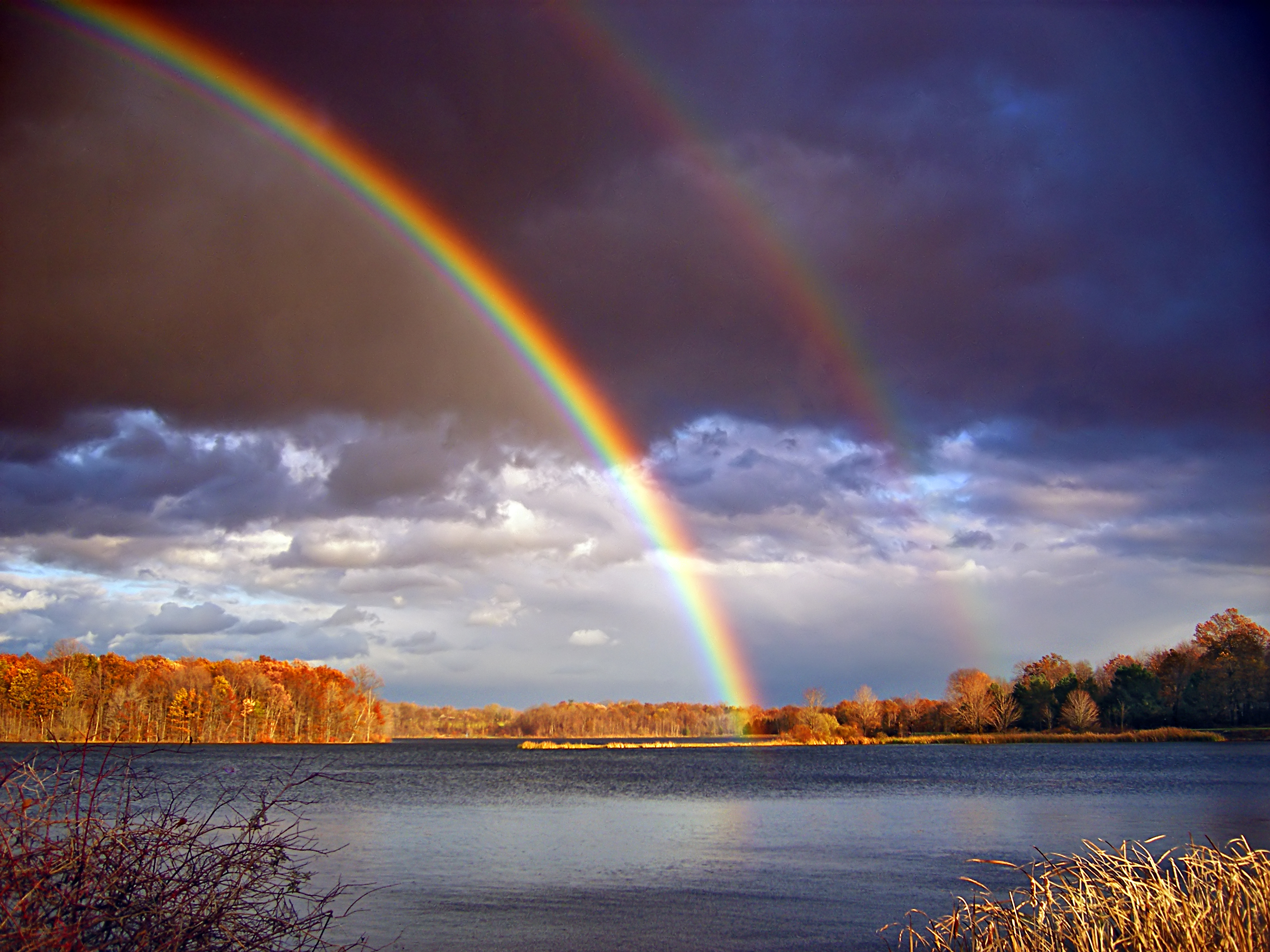
A double rainbow at Minsi Lake, Pennsylvania

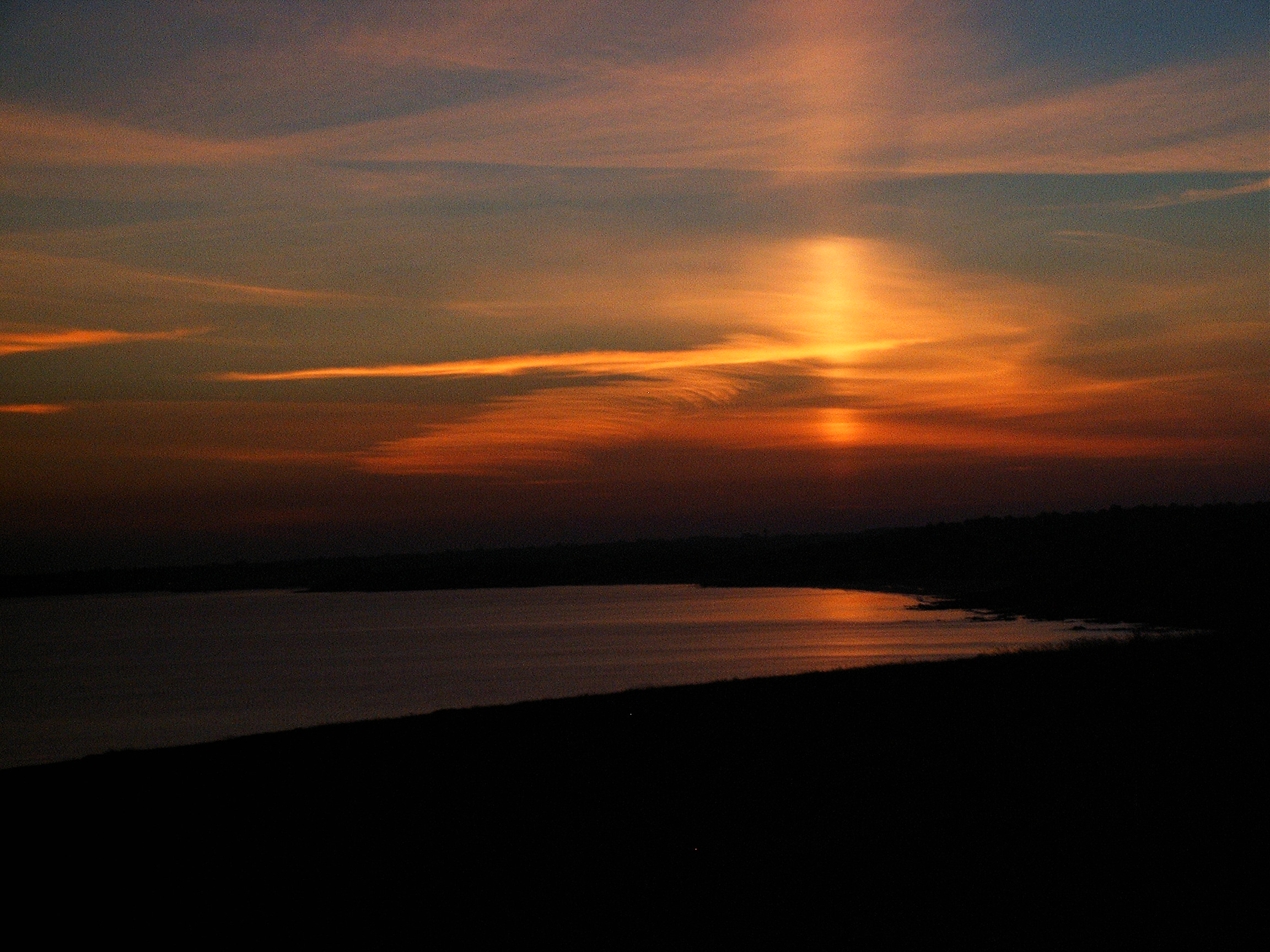
A sun pillar in Finistère, Brittany

Atmospheric optical phenomenon

== Non-atmospheric optical phenomena ==
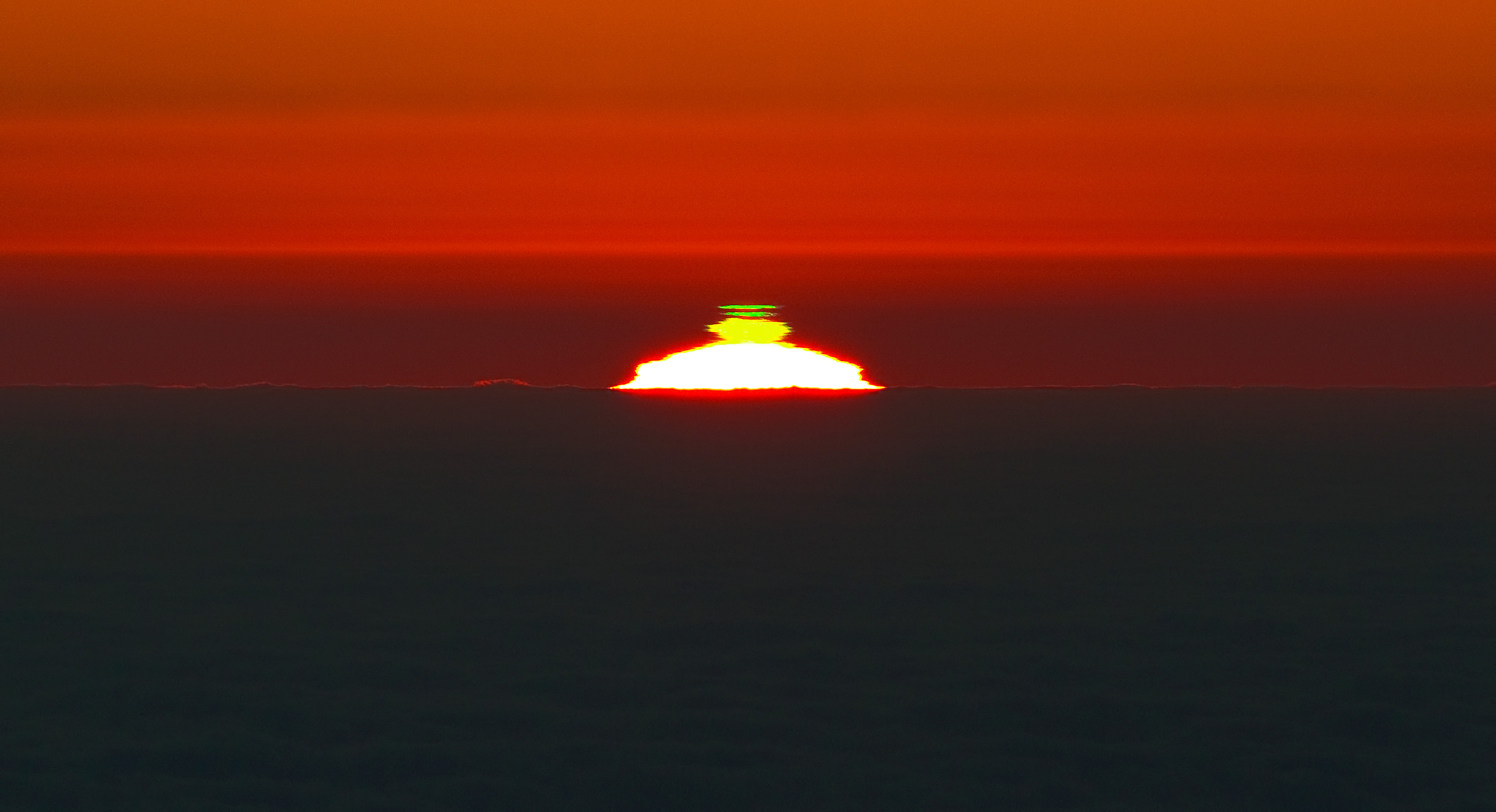
Green flash appears above the solar disc for a second or so. One such occurrence was taken from Cerro Paranal.

- Dichromatism
- Gegenschein
- Iridescence
- Opposition effect
- Shadow
  - Shade
  - Silhouette
- Sylvanshine
- Zodiacal light

=== Other optical effects ===
- Asterism, star gems such as star sapphire or star ruby
- Aura, a phenomenon in which gas or dust surrounding an object luminesces or reflects light from the object
- Aventurescence, also called the Schiller effect, spangled gems such as aventurine quartz and sunstone
- Baily's beads, grains of sunlight visible in total solar eclipses.
- Camera obscura, an inverted projection of a scene into a dark chamber
- Cathodoluminescence
- Caustics
- Chatoyancy, cat's eye gems such as chrysoberyl cat's eye or aquamarine cat's eye
- Chromatic polarization
- Diffraction, the apparent bending and spreading of light waves when they meet an obstruction
- Dispersion
- Double refraction or birefringence of calcite and other minerals
- Double-slit experiment
- Electroluminescence
- Evanescent wave
- Fluorescence, also called luminescence or photoluminescence
- Mie scattering (Why clouds are white)
- Metamerism as of alexandrite
- Moiré pattern
- Newton's rings, an alternating ring pattern created by the reflection of light between a spherical and flat surface
- Phosphorescence
- Pleochroism gems or crystals, which seem "many-colored"
- Rayleigh scattering (Why the sky is blue, sunsets are red, and associated phenomena)
- Reflection
- Refraction
- Sonoluminescence
  - Shrimpoluminescence
- Synchrotron radiation
- The separation of light into colors by a prism
- Triboluminescence
- Thomson scattering
- Total internal reflection
- Twisted light
- Umov effect
- Zeeman effect, the splitting of a spectral line into multiple components in the presence of a magnetic field
- The ability of light to travel through space or through a vacuum.

=== Entoptic phenomena ===
- Diffraction of light through the eyelashes
- Haidinger's brush
- Monocular diplopia (or polyplopia) from reflections at boundaries between the various ocular media
- Phosphenes from stimulation other than by light (e.g., mechanical, electrical) of the rod cells and cones of the eye or of other neurons of the visual system
- Purkinje images.

=== Optical illusions ===
- The unusually large size of the Moon as it rises and sets, the Moon illusion
- The shape of the sky, the sky bowl

== Unexplained phenomena ==
Some phenomena are yet to be conclusively explained and may possibly be some form of optical phenomena.

- Hessdalen lights
- Min Min lights
- Light of Saratoga
- Naga fireballs

== See also ==
- List of optical topics
- Optics

== Source ==
Ozerov, Ruslan P.; Vorobyev, Anatoli A. (2007). "Wave Optics and Quantum–Optical Phenomena". Physics for Chemists. pp. 361–422. doi:10.1016/B978-044452830-8/50008-8. ISBN 978-0-444-52830-8.
