= Supralateral arc =

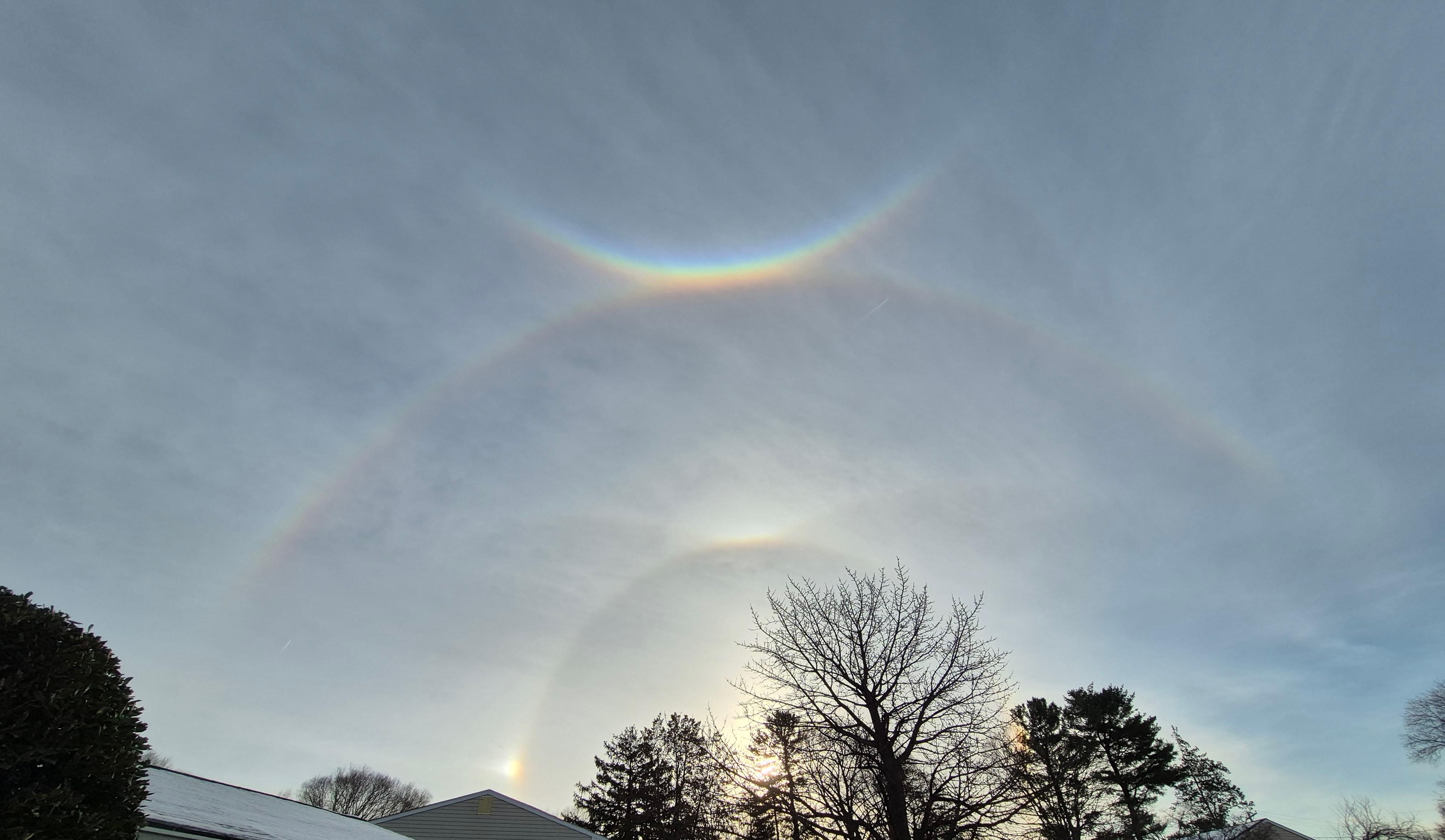
Complex halo with supralateral arc, Circumzenithal arc and Sun dogs

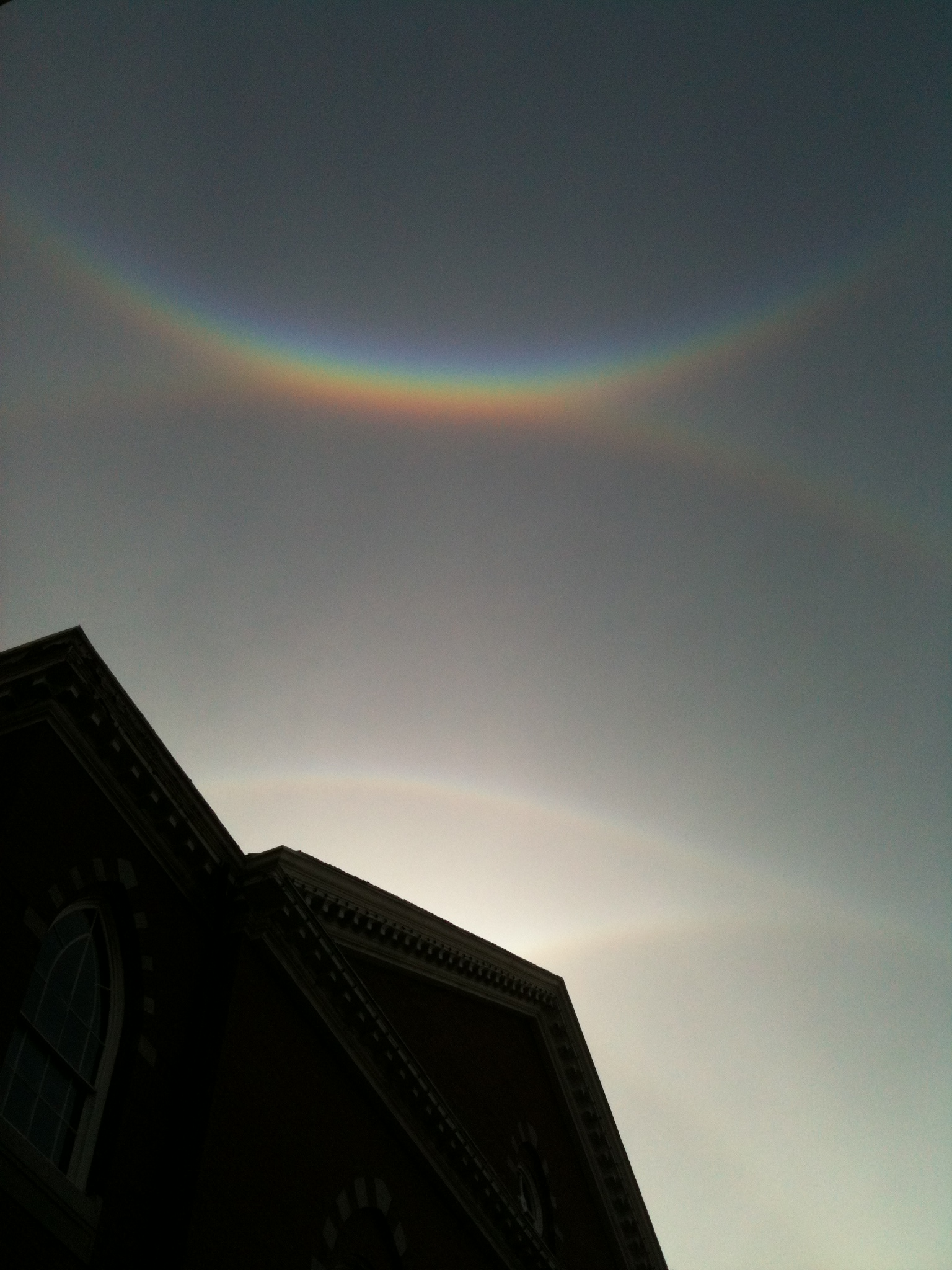
Circumzenithal arc, Supralateral arc, Parry arc, and Upper tangent arc, in Salem, Massachusetts, Oct 27, 2012.

A supralateral arc is a comparatively rare member of the halo family which in its complete form appears as a large, faintly rainbow-colored band in a wide arc above the sun and appearing to encircle it, at about twice the distance as the familiar 22° halo. In reality, however, the supralateral arc does not form a circle and never reaches below the sun. When present, the supralateral arc touches the (much more common) circumzenithal arc from below. As in all colored halos, the arc has its red side directed towards the sun, its blue part away from it.

== Formation ==
Supralateral arcs form when sun light enters horizontally oriented, rod-shaped hexagonal ice crystals through a hexagonal base and exits through one of the prism sides. Supralateral arcs occur about once a year.

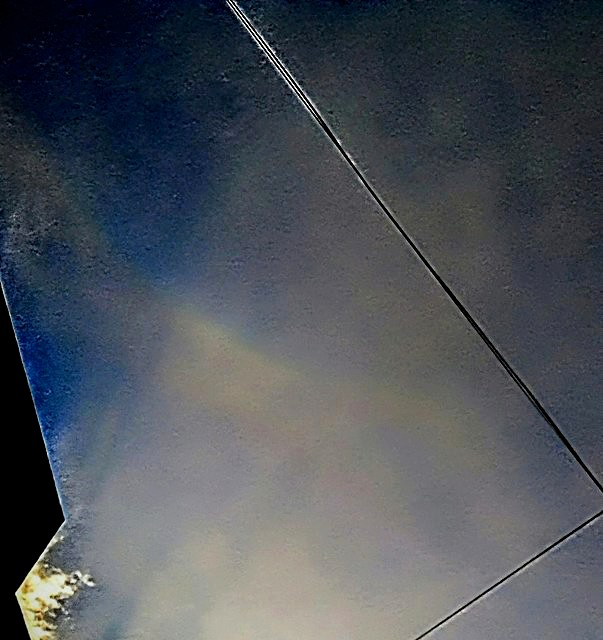
A faint circumzenithal arc above an also faint supralateral arc

== Confusion with the 46° halo ==
Due to its apparent circular shape and nearly identical location in the sky, the supralateral arc is often mistaken for the 46° halo, which does form a complete circle around the sun at approximately the same distance, but which is much rarer and fainter. Distinguishing between the two phenomena can be difficult, requiring the combination of several subtle indicators for proper identification.

In contrast to the static 46° halo, the shape of a supralateral arc varies with the elevation of the sun. Before the sun reaches 15°, the bases of the arc touch the lateral (oriented sidewise) sides of the 46° halo. As the sun rises from 15° to 27°, the supralateral arc almost overlaps the upper half of the 46° halo, which is why many reported observations of the latter most likely are observations of the former. As the sun goes from 27° to 32°, the apex of the arc touches the circumzenithal arc centered on zenith (as does the 46° halo when the sun is located between 15° and 27°). In addition, the supralateral arc is always located above the parhelic circle (the arc located below it is the infralateral arc), and is never perfectly circular.

Arguably the best way of distinguishing the halo from the arc is to carefully study the difference in colour and brightness. The 46° halo is six times fainter than the 22° halo and generally white with a possible red inner edge. The supralateral arc, in contrast, can even be confused with the rainbow with clear blue and green strokes.

== Gallery ==
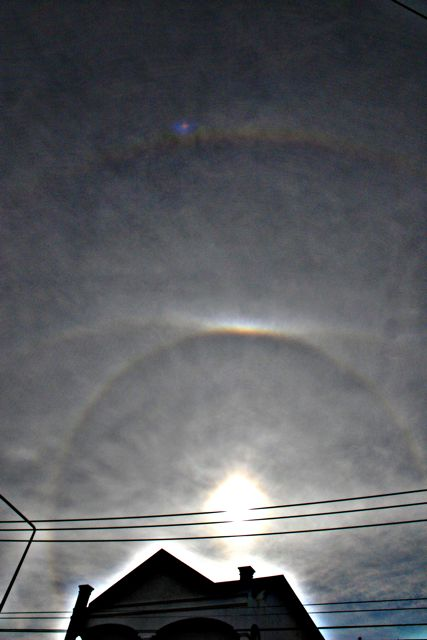
Solar Halo, Upper Tangent Arc, Supralateral Arc : 20 June 2009 : Khonkaen, Thailand

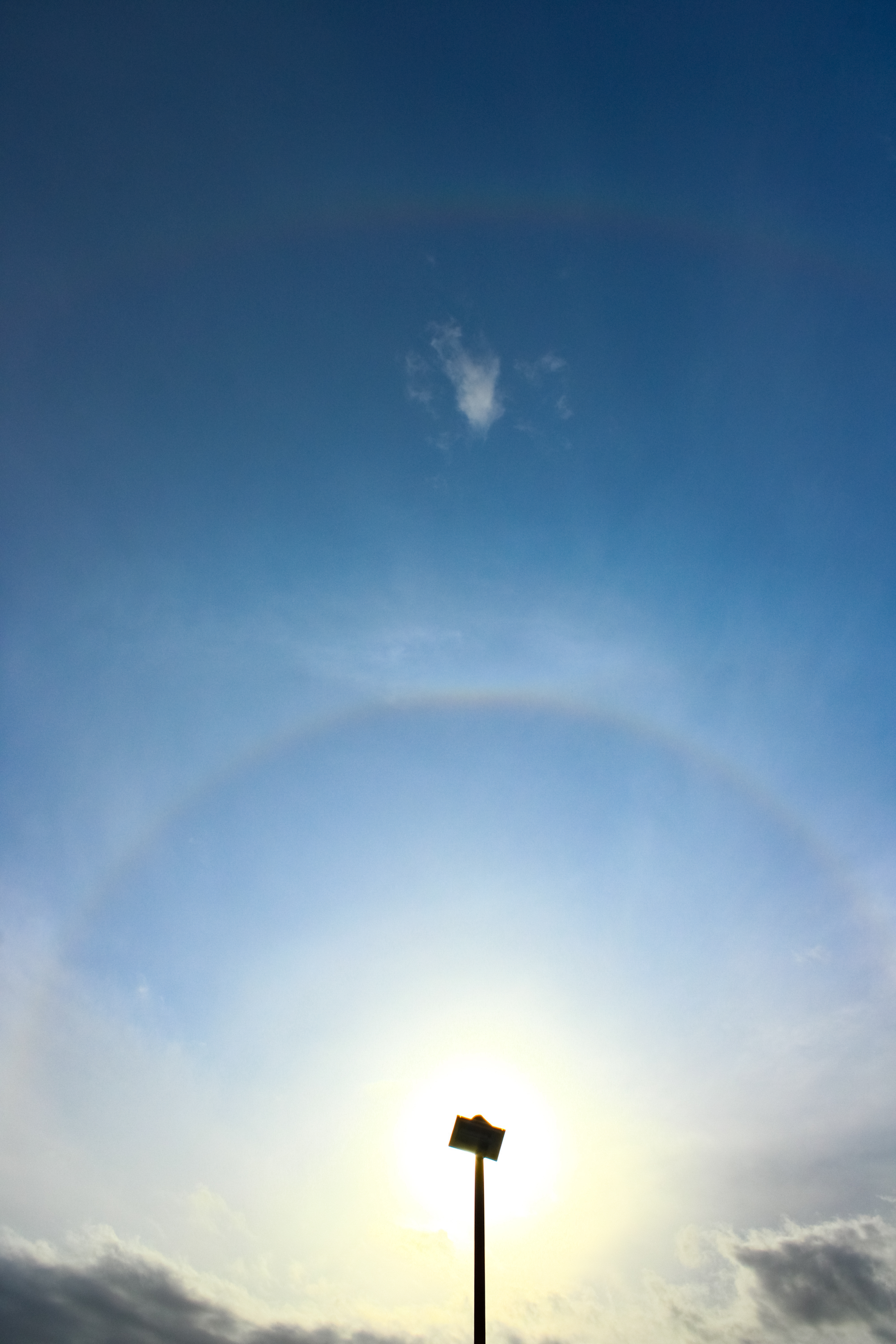
22° Halo, Upper Tangent Arc, Parry Arc, Supralateral Arc : May 2024 : Skagit Valley, Washington

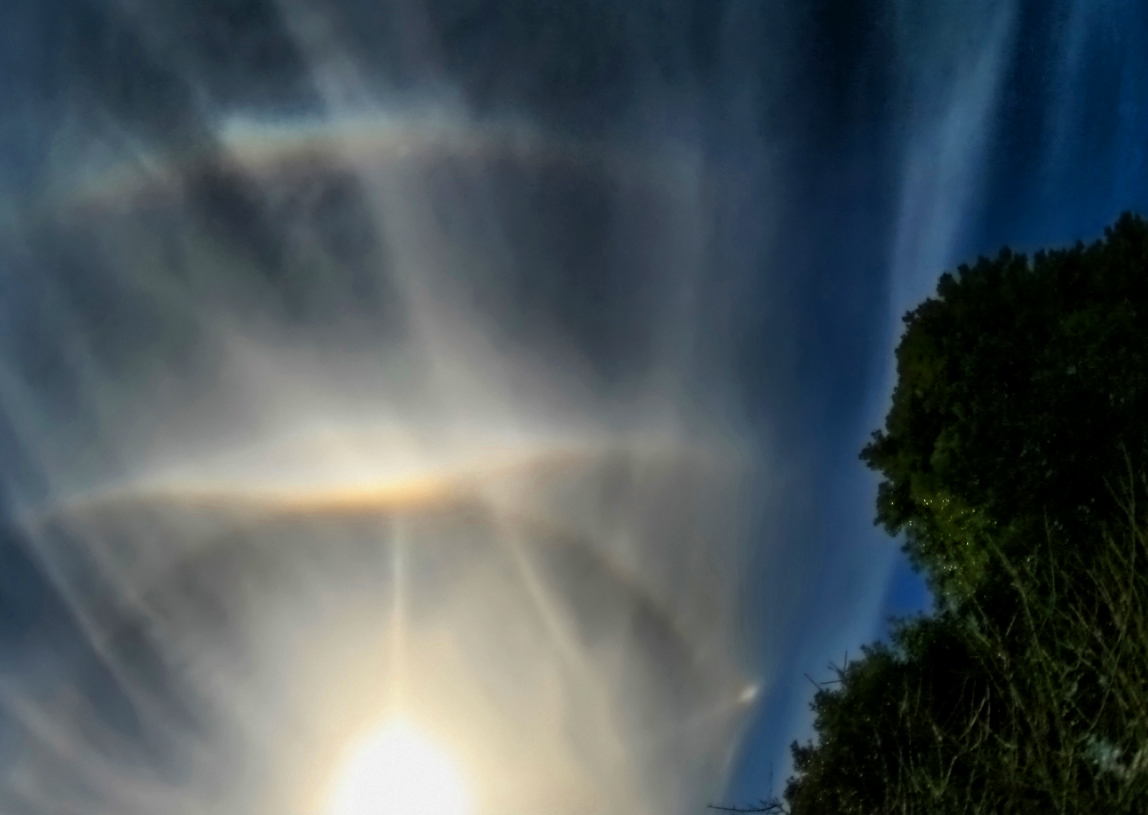
Complex halo display. Top to bottom: Supralateral arc, Parry arc, Upper tangent arc, 22° halo. Sun dog to the right of the Sun.

== See also ==
- Infralateral arc
- Parry arc
- Lowitz arc
