= Parry arc =

Optical phenomenon

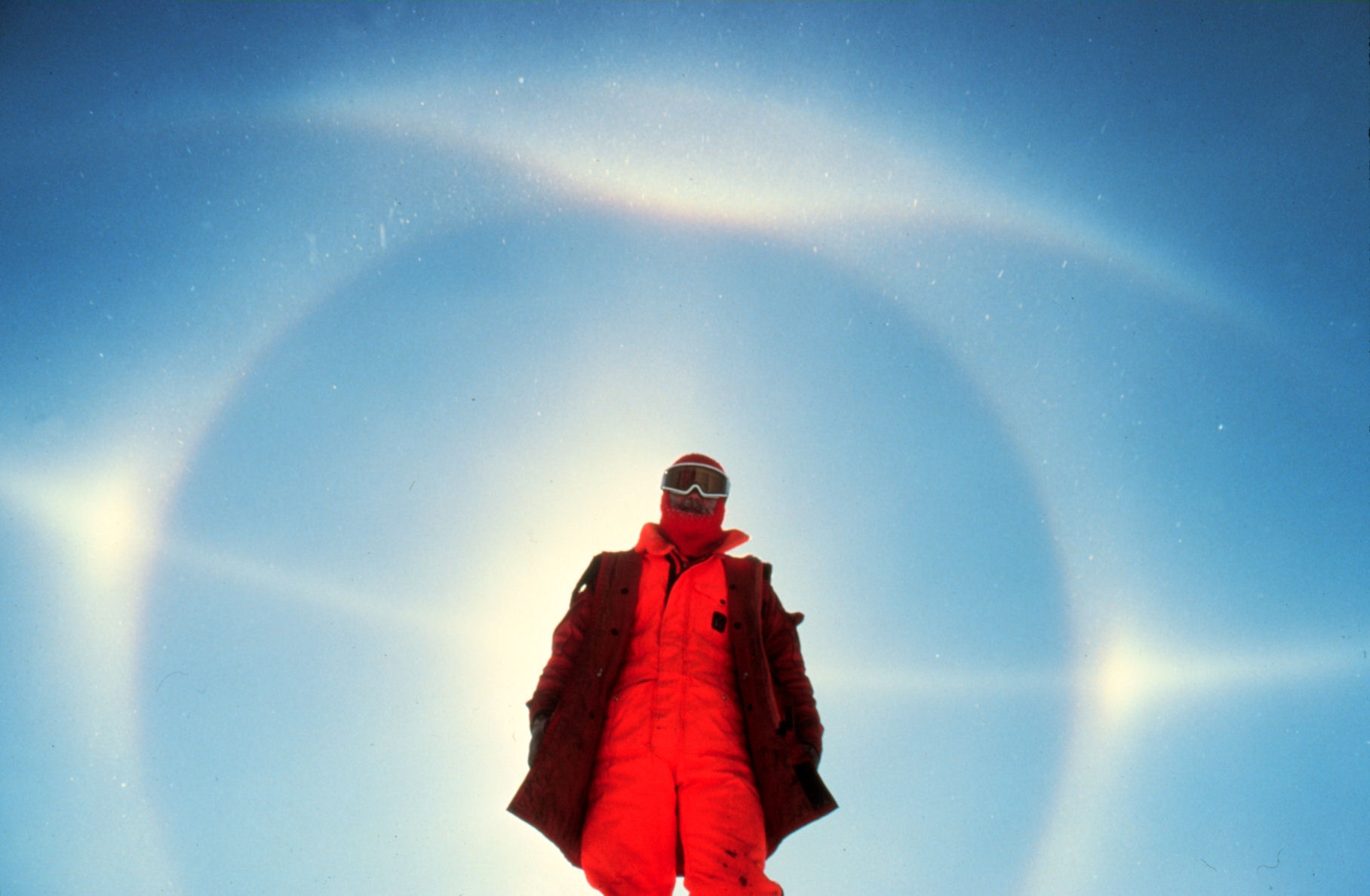
A halo display photo documented by Cindy McFee, NOAA, December 1980 at the South Pole Station. Several distinct halo phenomena are featured in the photo: Two sun dogs (bright spots), a parhelic circle (horizontal line), a 22° halo (circle), and an upper tangent arc and a Parry arc (top).

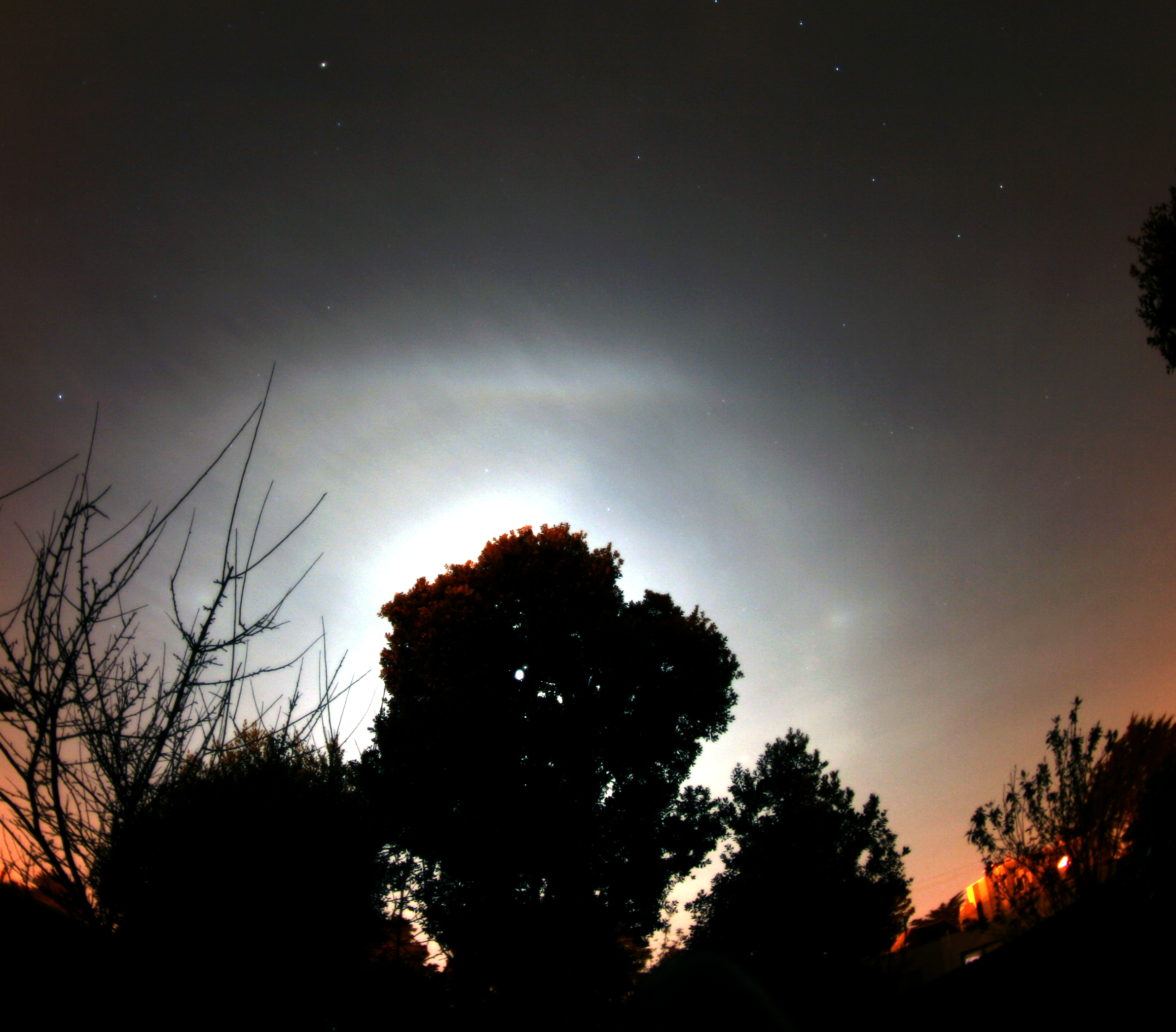
Complex Moon halo. Visible are: halo, Parry arc, upper tangent arc and Moon dogs.

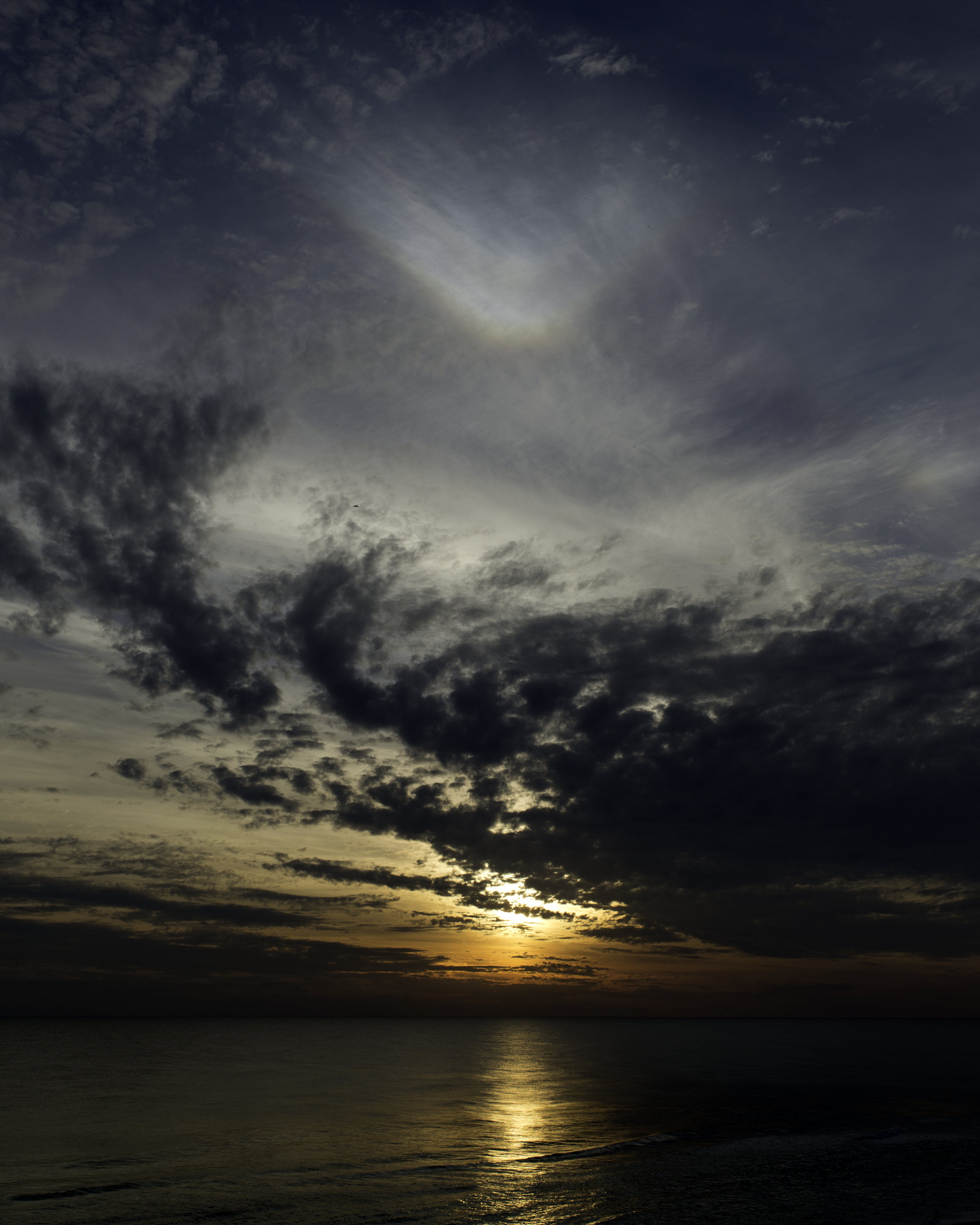
Upper tangent arc and sunvex Parry arc seen over Santa Rosa Beach, Florida.

A Parry arc is a rare halo, an optical phenomenon which occasionally appears over a 22° halo together with an upper tangent arc.

== Discovery ==
The halo was first described by Sir William Edward Parry (1790–1855) in 1820 during one of his Arctic expeditions in search for the Northwest Passage. On April 8, under harsh conditions while his two ships were trapped by ice forcing him to winter over at Melville Island in the northern Canadian Arctic Archipelago, he made a drawing of the phenomenon. The drawing accurately renders the parhelic circle, a 22° halo, a pair of sun dogs, a lower tangent arc, a 46° halo, and a circumzenithal arc. He did, however, get the upper tangent arc slightly wrong. On the other hand, he added two arcs extending laterally from the bases of the 46° halo, for long interpreted as incorrectly drawn infralateral arcs, but were probably correctly drawn subhelic arcs (both produced by the same crystal orientation but with light passing through different faces of the crystals).

== Formation ==
Parry arcs are generated by double-oriented hexagonal column ice crystals, i.e. a so-called Parry orientation, where both the central main axis of the prism and the top and bottom prism side faces are oriented horizontally. This orientation is responsible for several rare haloes. Parry arcs are the result of light passing through two side faces forming a 60° angle. The shape of Parry arcs changes with the elevation of the sun and are subsequently called upper or lower arcs to indicate they are found above or under the sun, and sunvex or suncave depending on their orientation.

The mechanism by which column crystals adopt this special Parry orientation has been subject to much speculation – recent laboratory experiments have shown that it is the presence of crystals with a scalene hexagonal cross-section which are likely to be the cause.

Parry arcs can be confused with either upper tangent arcs, Lowitz arcs, and any of the odd radius halos produced by pyramidal crystals.

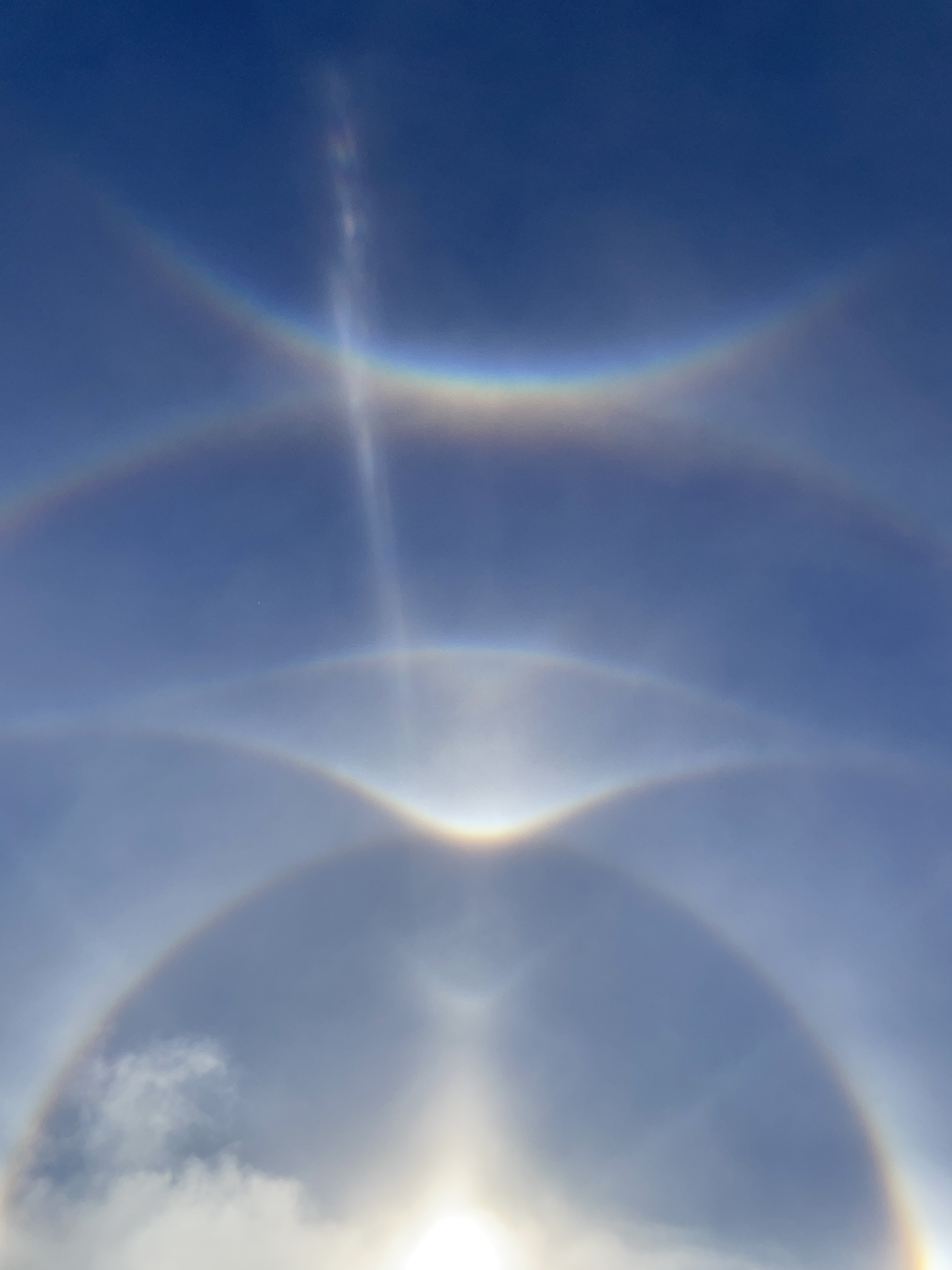
Detail of a Parry arc along with an upper tangent arc, both visible between a 22° halo and a 46° halo.

== See also ==
- Lowitz arc
