= Halo (optical phenomenon) =

Optical phenomenon of the sky

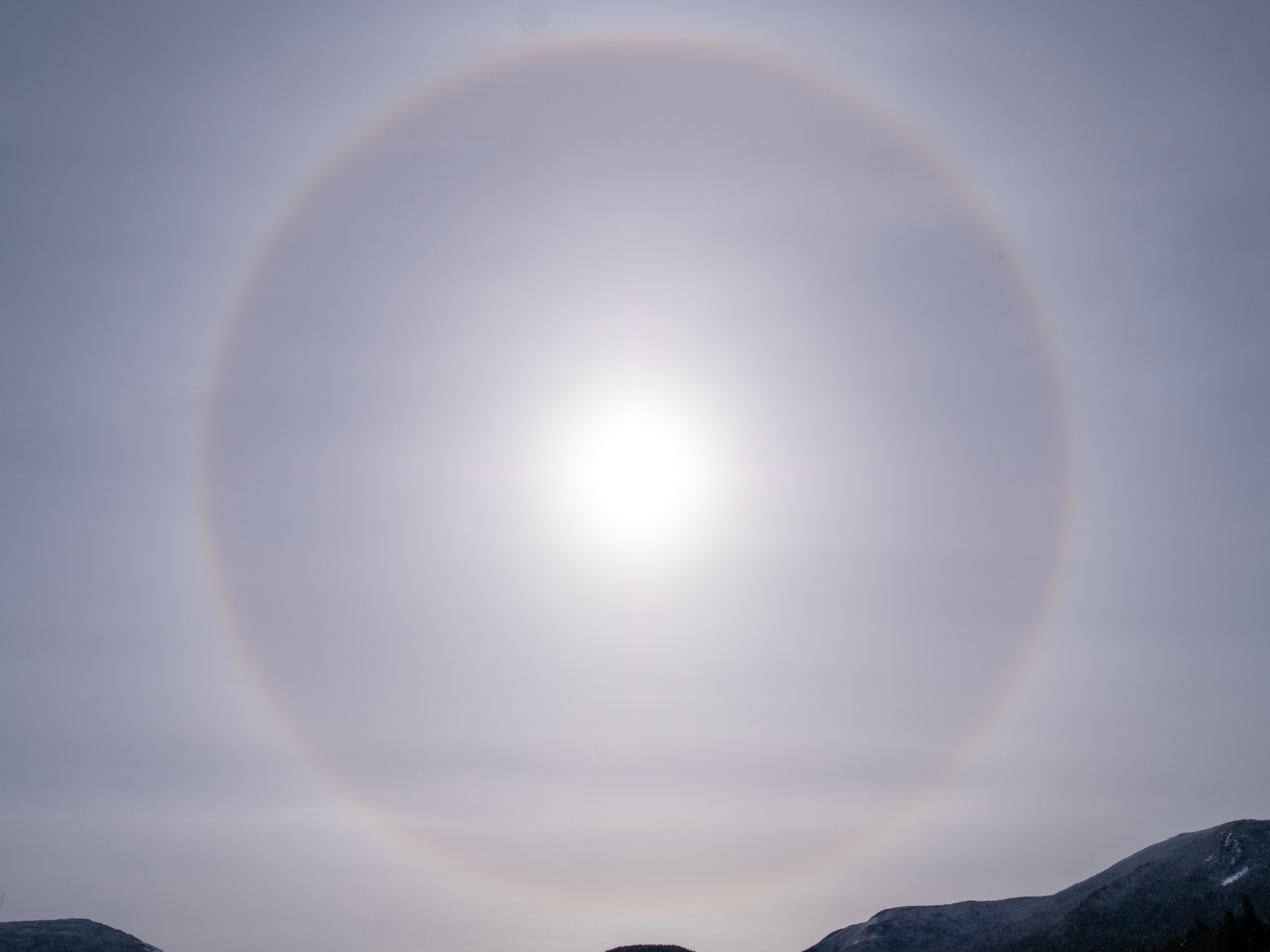
A 22° halo around the Sun, observed over Bretton Woods, New Hampshire, USA on February 13, 2021

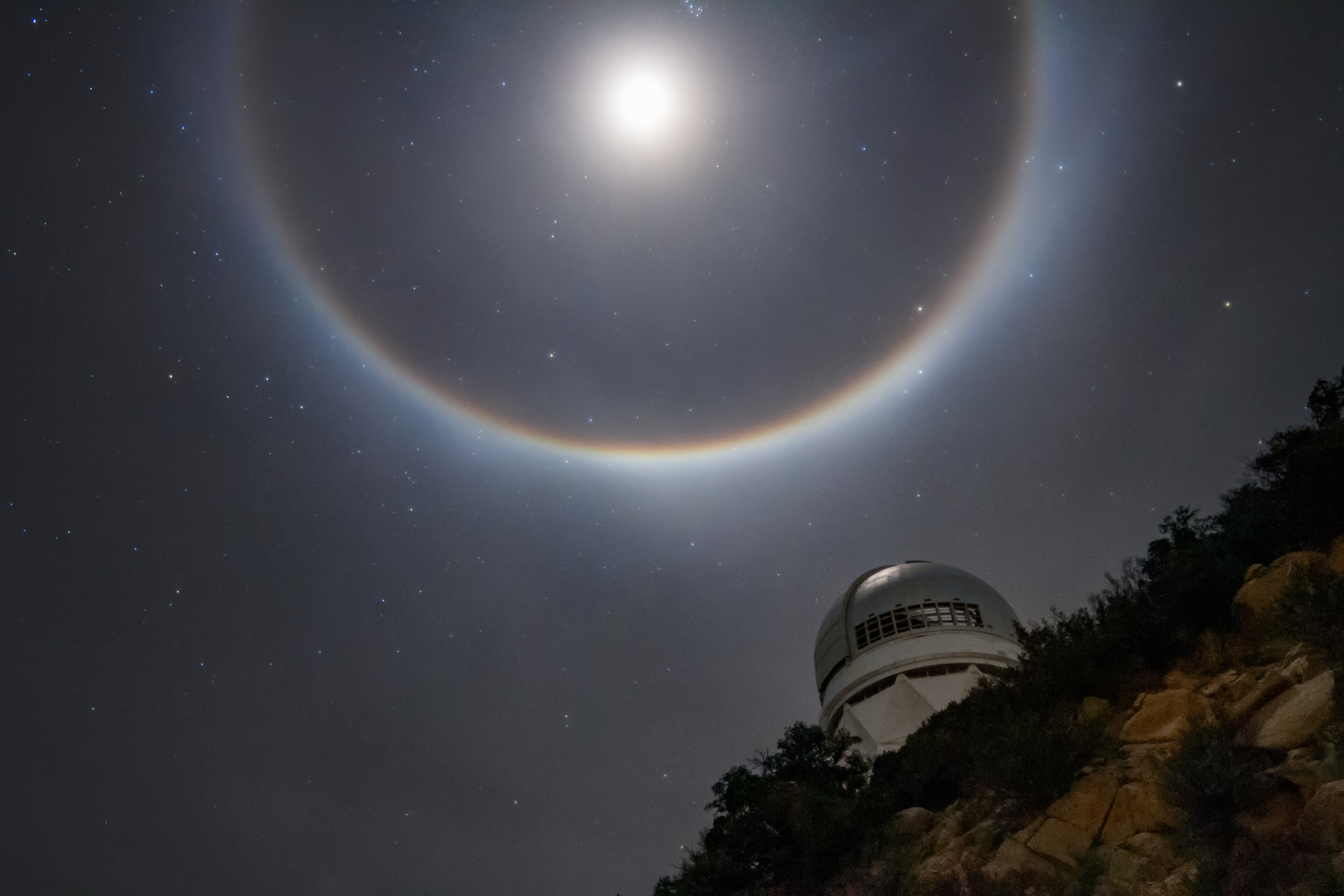
A 22° halo and circumscribed halo around the Moon, observed near Kitt Peak National Observatory

From top to bottom: A circumzenithal arc, supralateral arc, Parry arc, upper tangent arc, and 22° halo

A halo (from Ancient Greek ἅλως (hálōs) 'threshing floor, disk') is an optical phenomenon produced by light (typically from the Sun or Moon) interacting with ice crystals suspended in the atmosphere. Halos can have many forms, ranging from colored or white rings to arcs and spots in the sky. Many of these appear near the Sun or Moon, but others occur elsewhere or even in the opposite part of the sky. Among the best known halo types are the circular halo (properly called the 22° halo), light pillars, and sun dogs, but many others occur; some are fairly common while others are extremely rare.

The ice crystals responsible for halos are typically suspended in cirrus or cirrostratus clouds in the upper troposphere (5–10 km (3.1–6.2 mi)), but in cold weather they can also float near the ground, in which case they are referred to as diamond dust. The particular shape and orientation of the crystals are responsible for the type of halo observed. Light is reflected and refracted by the ice crystals and may split into colors because of dispersion. The crystals behave like prisms and mirrors, refracting and reflecting light between their faces, sending shafts of light in particular directions.

Atmospheric optical phenomena like halos were part of weather lore, which was an empirical means of weather forecasting before meteorology was developed. They often do indicate that rain will fall within the next 24 hours, since the cirrostratus clouds that cause them can signify an approaching frontal system.

Other common types of optical phenomena involving water droplets rather than ice crystals include the glory and the rainbow.

== History ==
While Aristotle had mentioned halos and parhelia in antiquity, the first European descriptions of complex displays were those of Christoph Scheiner in Rome (c. 1630), Johannes Hevelius in Danzig (1661), and Tobias Lowitz in St Petersburg (1790). Chinese observers had recorded these for centuries, the first reference being a section of the "Official History of the Chin Dynasty" (Chin Shu) in 637, on the "Ten Haloes", giving technical terms for 26 solar halo phenomena.

=== Vädersolstavlan ===
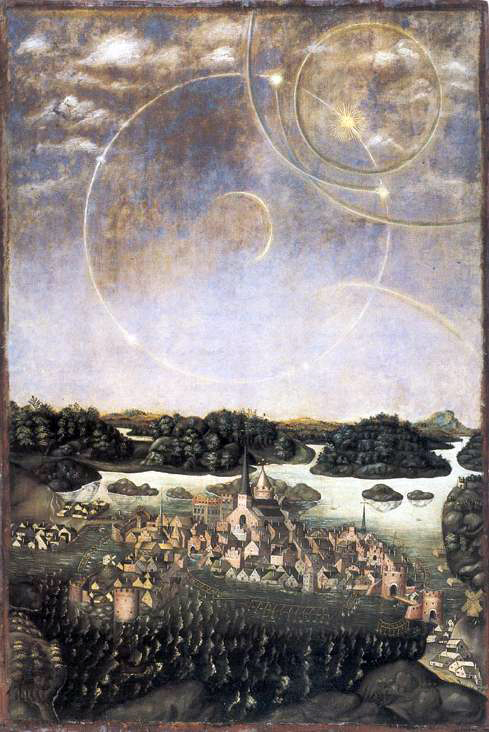
The so-called "Sun Dog Painting" (Vädersolstavlan) depicting Stockholm in 1535 and the celestial phenomenon at the time interpreted as an ominous presage

While mostly known and often quoted for being the oldest color depiction of the city of Stockholm, Vädersolstavlan (Swedish; "The Sundog Painting", literally "The Weather Sun Painting") is arguably also one of the oldest known depictions of a halo display, including a pair of sun dogs. For two hours in the morning of 20 April 1535, the skies over the city were filled with white circles and arcs crossing the sky, while additional suns (i.e., sun dogs) appeared around the Sun.

== Light pillar ==
A light pillar, or sun pillar, appears as a vertical pillar or column of light rising from the Sun near sunset or sunrise, though it can appear below the Sun, particularly if the observer is at a high elevation or altitude. Hexagonal plate- and column-shaped ice crystals cause the phenomenon. Plate crystals generally cause pillars only when the Sun is within 6 degrees of the horizon; column crystals can cause a pillar when the Sun is as high as 20 degrees above the horizon. The crystals tend to orient themselves near-horizontally as they fall or float through the air, and the width and visibility of a sun pillar depend on crystal alignment.

Light pillars can also form around the Moon, and around street lights or other bright lights. Pillars forming from ground-based light sources may appear much taller than those associated with the Sun or Moon. Since the observer is closer to the light source, crystal orientation matters less in the formation of these pillars.

== Circular halo ==
Ice crystals (only four represented above) form the 22° halo, with red and blue light being refracted at slightly different angles

Among the best-known halos is the 22° halo, often just called "halo", which appears as a large ring around the Sun or Moon with a radius of about 22° (roughly the width of an outstretched hand at arm's length). The ice crystals that cause the 22° halo are oriented semi-randomly in the atmosphere, in contrast to the horizontal orientation required for some other halos such as sun dogs and light pillars. As a result of the optical properties of the ice crystals involved, no light is reflected towards the inside of the ring, leaving the sky noticeably darker than the sky around it, and giving it the impression of a "hole in the sky". The 22° halo is not to be confused with the corona, which is a different optical phenomenon caused by water droplets rather than ice crystals, and which has the appearance of a multicolored disk rather than a ring.

Other halos can form at 46° to the Sun, or at the horizon, or around the zenith, and can appear as full halos or incomplete arcs.

== Bottlinger's ring ==
A Bottlinger's ring is a rare type of halo that is elliptical instead of circular. It has a small diameter, which makes it very difficult to see in the Sun's glare and more likely to be noticed around the dimmer subsun, often seen from mountain tops or airplanes. Bottlinger's rings are not well understood yet. It is suggested that they are formed by very flat pyramidal ice crystals with faces at uncommonly low angles, suspended horizontally in the atmosphere. These precise and physically problematic requirements would explain why the halo is very rare.

== Other names ==
In the Cornish dialect of English, a halo around the sun or the moon is called a cock's eye and is an omen of bad weather. The term is related to the Breton word kog-heol (sun cock) which has the same meaning. In Nepal, the halo round the sun is called Indrasabha with a connotation of the assembly court of Lord Indra – the Hindu god of lightning, thunder, and rain.

== Artificial halos ==
The natural phenomena may be reproduced artificially by several means. Firstly, by computer simulations, or secondly by experimental means. Regarding the latter, this occurs when a single crystal is rotated around the appropriate axis/axes, or a chemical approach. A still further and more indirect experimental approach is to find analogous refraction geometries.

=== Analogous refraction approach ===
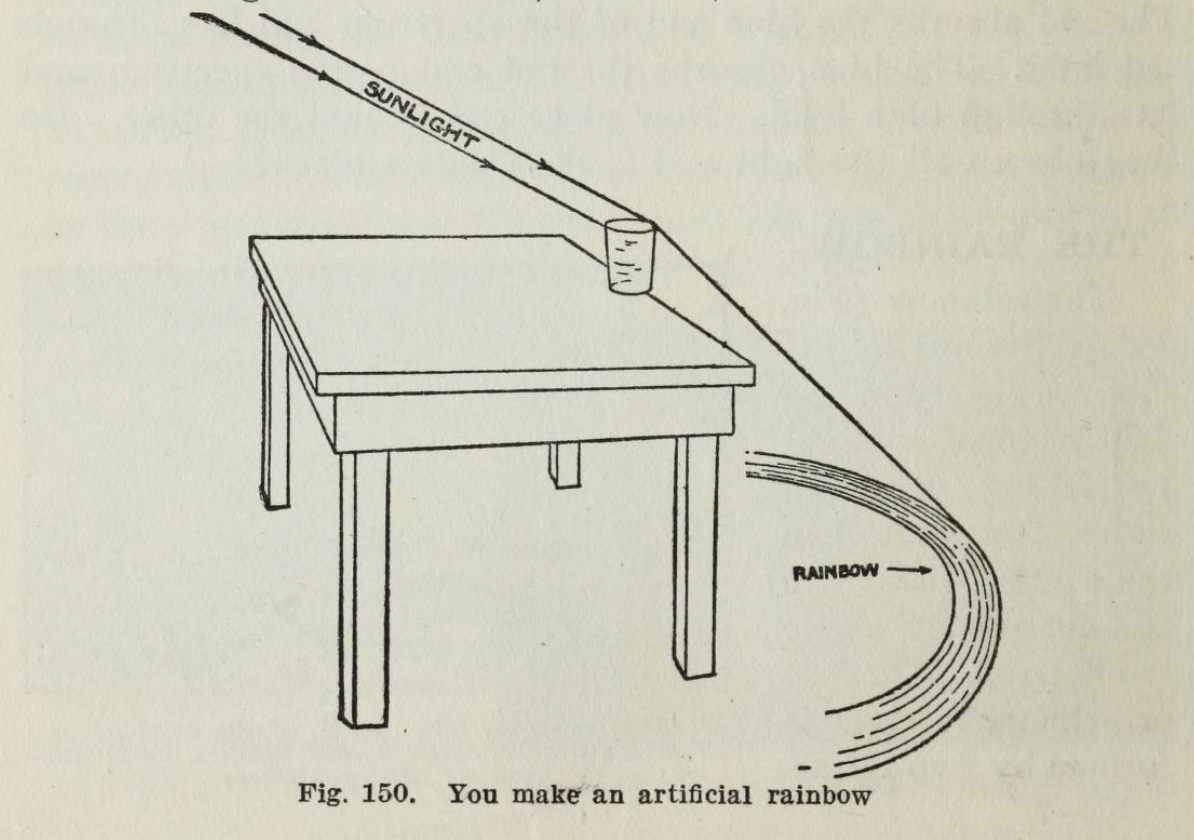
Analogous refraction demonstration experiment for the circumzenithal arc. Here, it is mistakenly labelled as an artificial rainbow in Gilberts book.

This approach employs the fact that in some cases the average geometry of refraction through an ice crystal may be imitated / mimicked via the refraction through another geometrical object. In this way, the circumzenithal arc, the circumhorizontal arc, and the suncave Parry arcs may be recreated by refraction through rotationally symmetric (i.e. non-prismatic) static bodies. A particularly simple table-top experiment reproduces artificially the colorful circumzenithal and circumhorizontal arcs using a water glass only. The refraction through the cylinder of water turns out to be (almost) identical to the rotationally averaged refraction through an upright hexagonal ice crystal / plate-oriented crystals, thereby creating vividly colored circumzenithal and the circumhorizontal arcs. In fact, the water glass experiment is often confused as representing a rainbow and has been around at least since 1920.

Following Huygens' idea of the (false) mechanism of the 22° parhelia, one may also illuminate (from the side) a water-filled cylindrical glass with an inner central obstruction of half the glasses' diameter to achieve upon projection on a screen an appearance which closely resembles parhelia (cf. footnote [39] in Ref., or see here), an inner red edge transitioning into a white band at larger angles on both sides of the direct transmission direction. However, while the visual match is close, this particular experiment does not involve a fake caustic mechanism and is thus no real analogue.

=== Chemical approaches ===
The earliest chemical recipes to generate artificial halos has been put forward by Brewster and studied further by A. Cornu in 1889. The idea was to generate crystals by precipitation of a salt solution. The innumerable small crystals hereby generated will then, upon illumination with light, cause halos corresponding to the particular crystal geometry and the orientation / alignment. Several recipes exist and continue to be discovered. Rings are a common outcome of such experiments. But also Parry arcs have been artificially produced in this way.

=== Mechanical approaches ===
==== Single axis ====
The earliest experimental studies on halo phenomena have been attributed to Auguste Bravais in 1847. Bravais used an equilateral glass prism which he spun around its vertical axis. When illuminated by parallel white light, this produced an artificial parhelic circle and many of the embedded parhelia. Similarly, A. Wegener used hexagonal rotating crystals to produce artificial subparhelia. In a more recent version of this experiment, many more embedded parhelia have been found using commercially available hexagonal BK7 glass crystals. Simple experiments like these can be used for educational purposes and demonstration experiments. Unfortunately, using glass crystals one cannot reproduce the circumzenithal arc or the circumhorizontal arc due to total internal reflections preventing the required ray-paths when $n<\sqrt{2}$.

Even earlier than Bravais, the Italian scientist F. Venturi experimented with pointed water-filled prisms to demonstrate the circumzenithal arc. However, this explanation was replaced later by the CZA's correct explanation by Bravais.

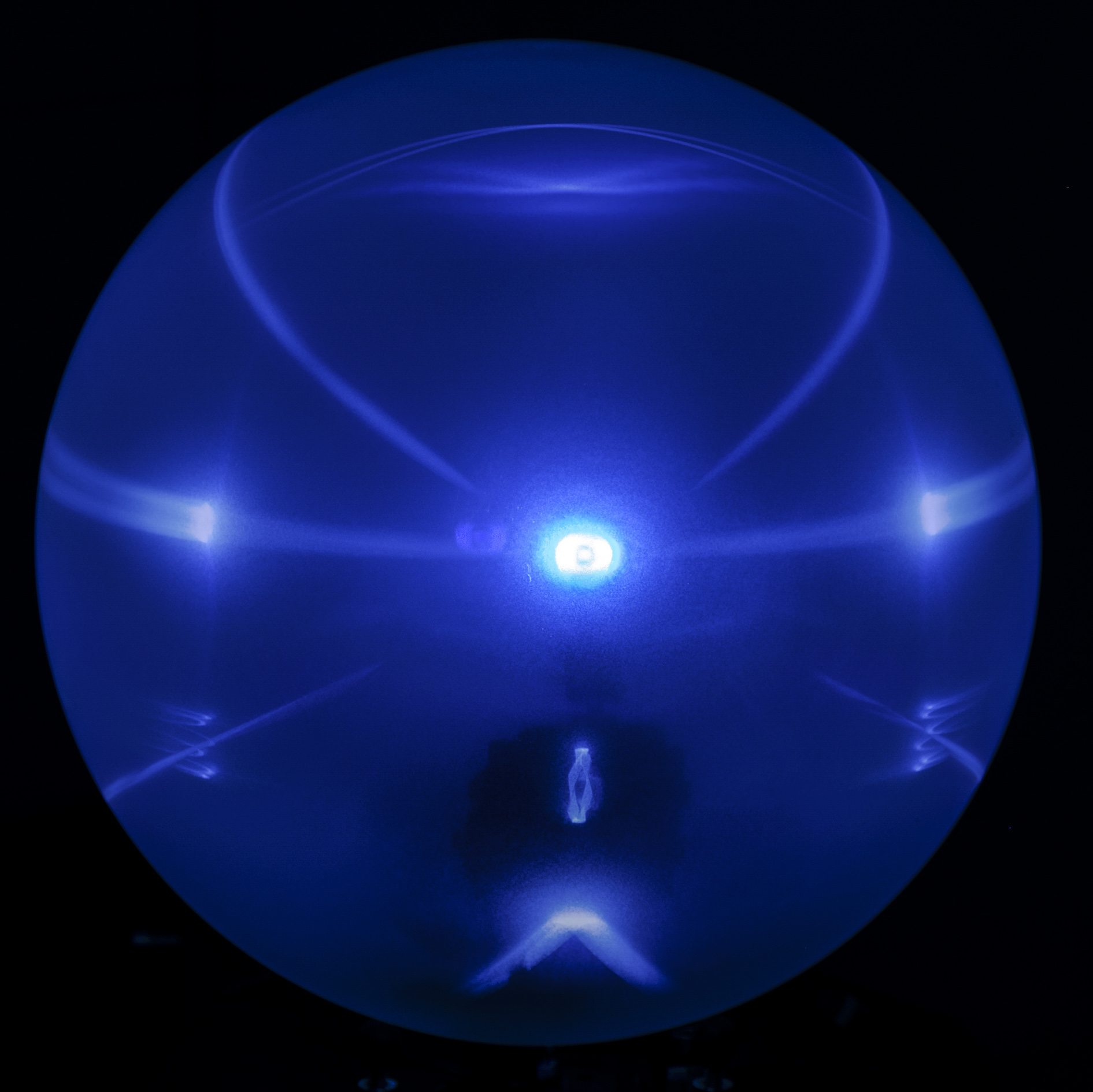
Artificial Halo projected on a spherical screen. Visible are: Tangential arcs, Parry arcs, (sub)parhelia, parhelic circle, heliac arcs

Artificial ice crystals have been employed to create halos which are otherwise unattainable in the mechanical approach via the use of glass crystals, e.g. circumzenithal and circumhorizontal arcs. The use of ice crystals ensures that the generated halos have the same angular coordinates as the natural phenomena. Other crystals such as sodium fluoride (NaF) also have a refractive index close to ice and have been used in the past.

==== Two axes ====
In order to produce artificial halos such as the tangent arcs or the circumscribed halo one should rotate a single columnar hexagonal crystal about 2 axes. Similarly, the Lowitz arcs can be created by rotating a single plate crystal about two axes. This can be done by engineered halo machines. The first such machine was constructed in 2003; several more followed. Putting such machines inside spherical projection screens, and by the principle of the so-called sky transform, the analogy is nearly perfect. A realization using micro-versions of the aforementioned machines produces authentic distortion-free projections of such complex artificial halos. Finally, superposition of several images and projections produced by such halo machines may be combined to create a single image. The resulting superposition image is then a representation of complex natural halo displays containing many different orientation sets of ice prisms.

==== Three axes ====
The experimental reproduction of circular halos is the most difficult using a single crystal only, while it is the simplest and typically achieved one using chemical recipes. Using a single crystal, one needs to realize all possible 3D orientations of the crystal. This has recently been achieved by two approaches. The first one using pneumatics and a sophisticated rigging, and a second one using an Arduino-based random walk machine which stochastically reorients a crystal embedded in a transparent thin-walled sphere.

== Gallery ==
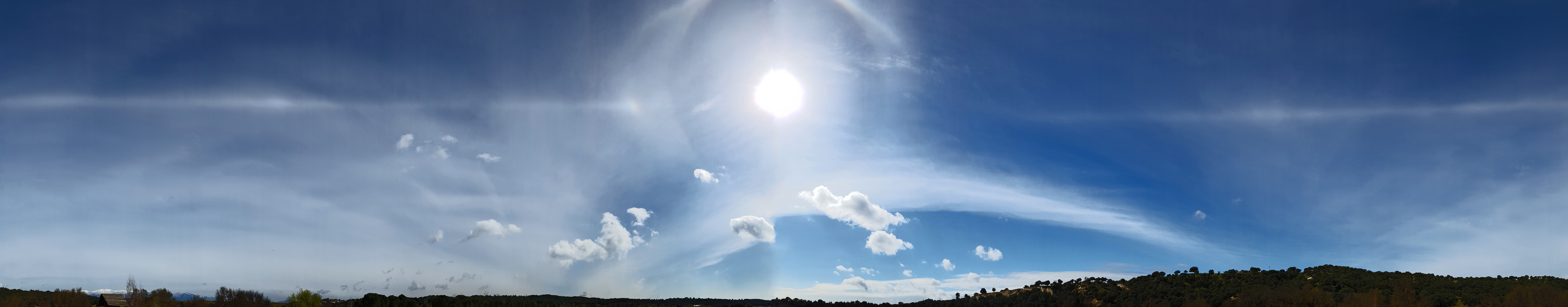
360 degree panorama of a parhelic circle and several other halos in Madrid on March 25, 2017

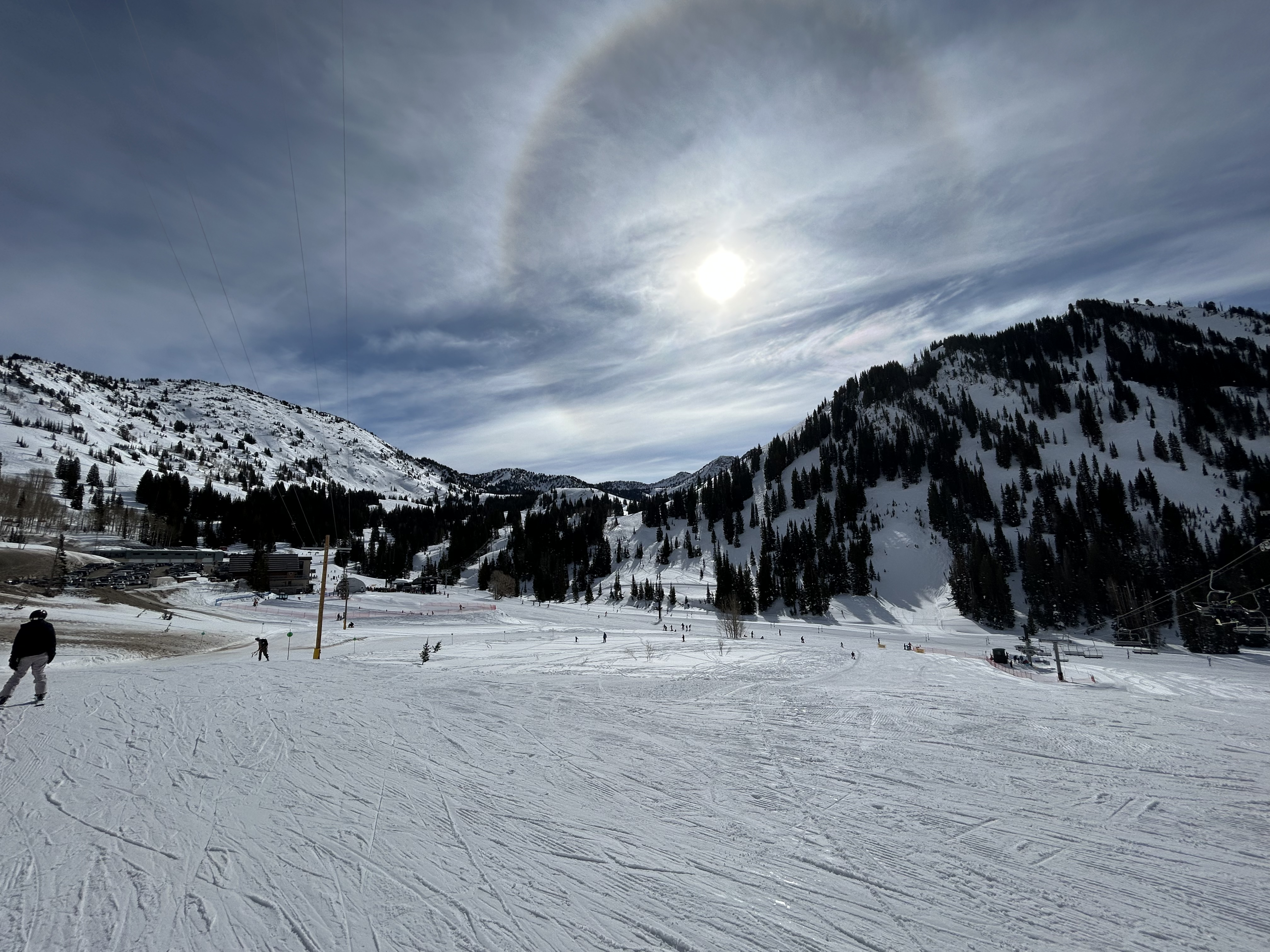
Solar halo at the Alta Ski Area near the Snowpine lift on February 12, 2023

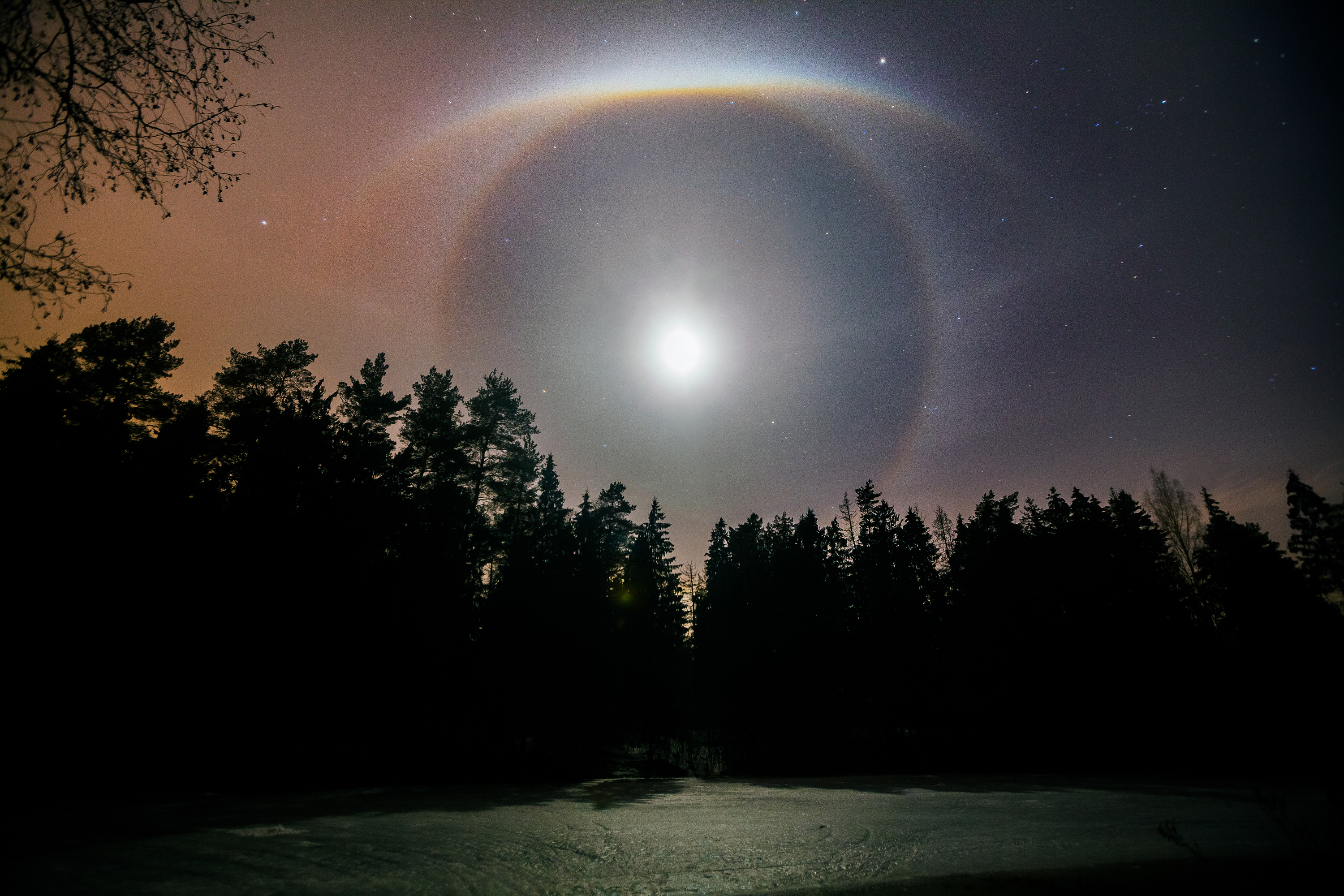
Long exposure of a night-time lunar halo display, including an upper tangent arc, 22° halo, and paraselenic circle

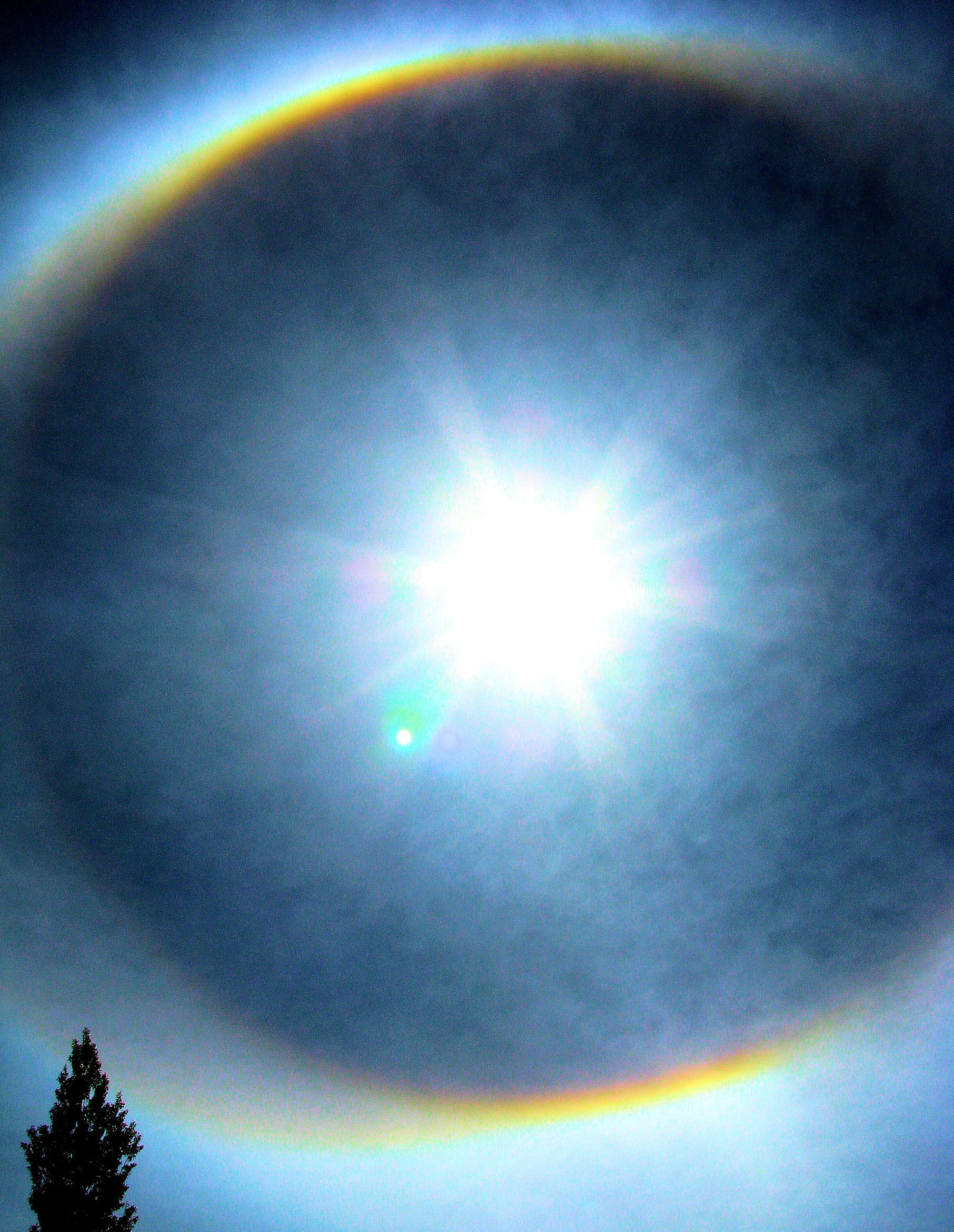
A circumscribed halo (outer ring, partially visible on the bottom left and top left/right) together with a 22° halo (inner ring)

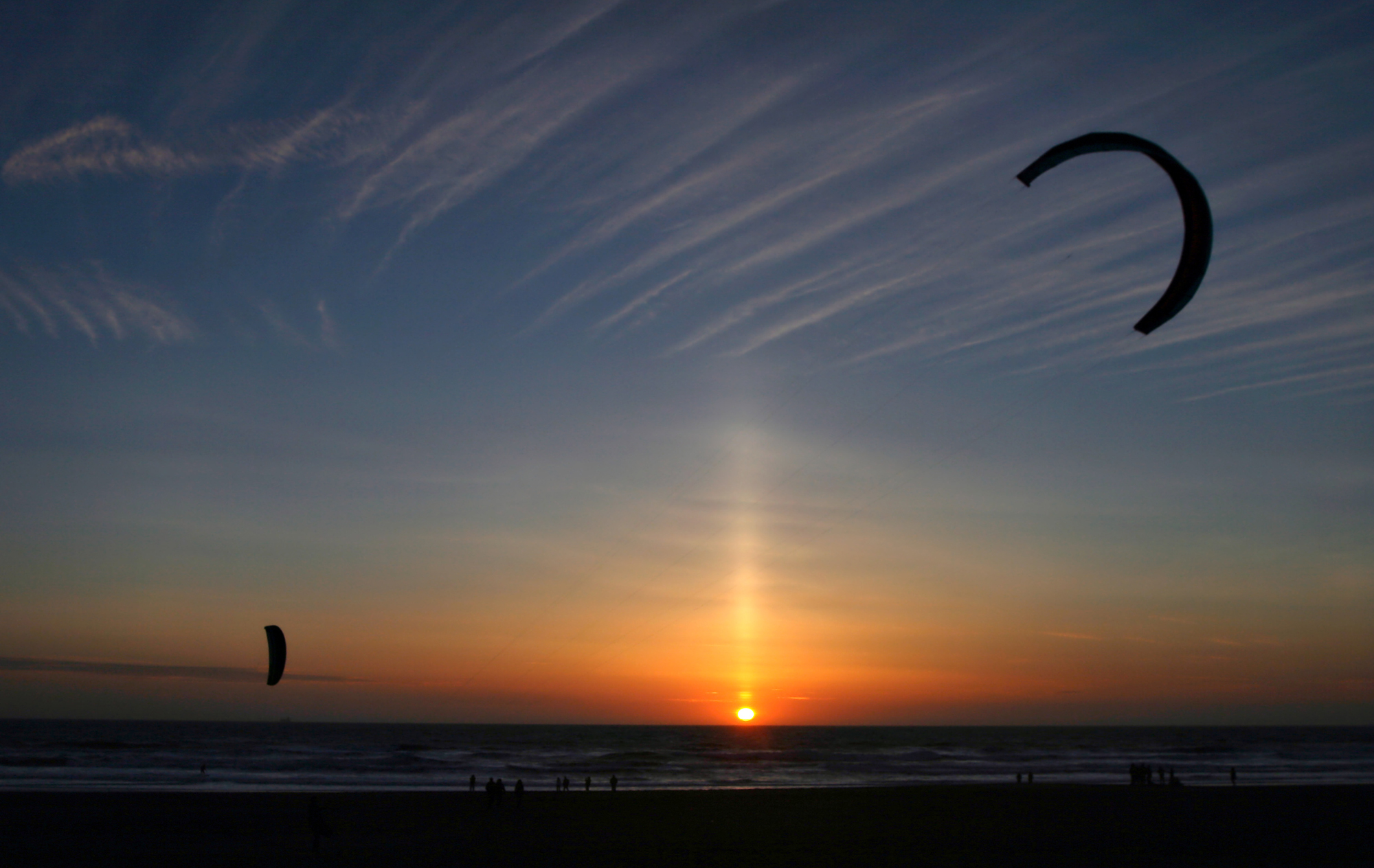
Sun pillar in San Francisco

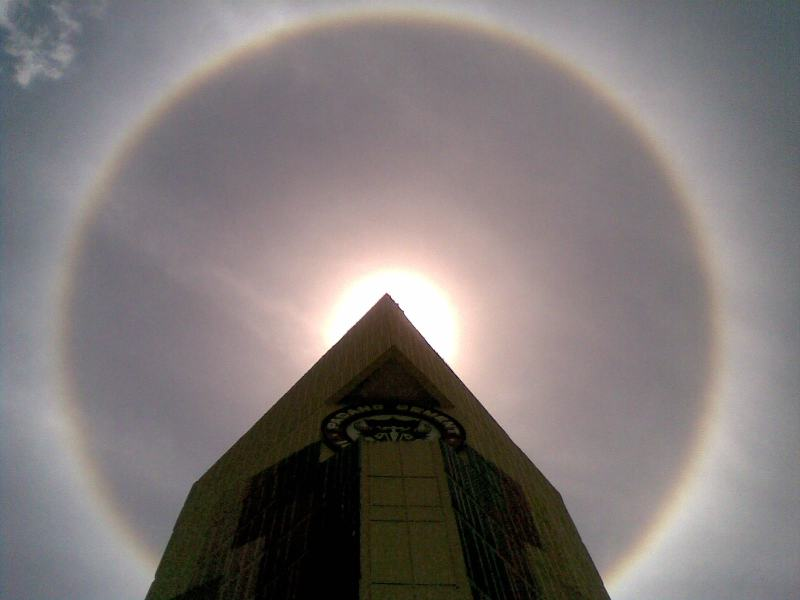
22° halo around the Sun, above PT Semen Padang building at Padang, Indonesia, October 2, 2009, at 11:09 am

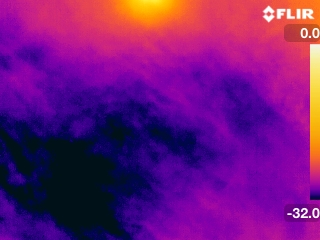
Atmospheric temperatures responsible for ice crystals around 22° halo, as viewed through a thermal camera (°C). The halo itself is not present in the thermal spectrum. The Sun is partially visible at the top of the image.

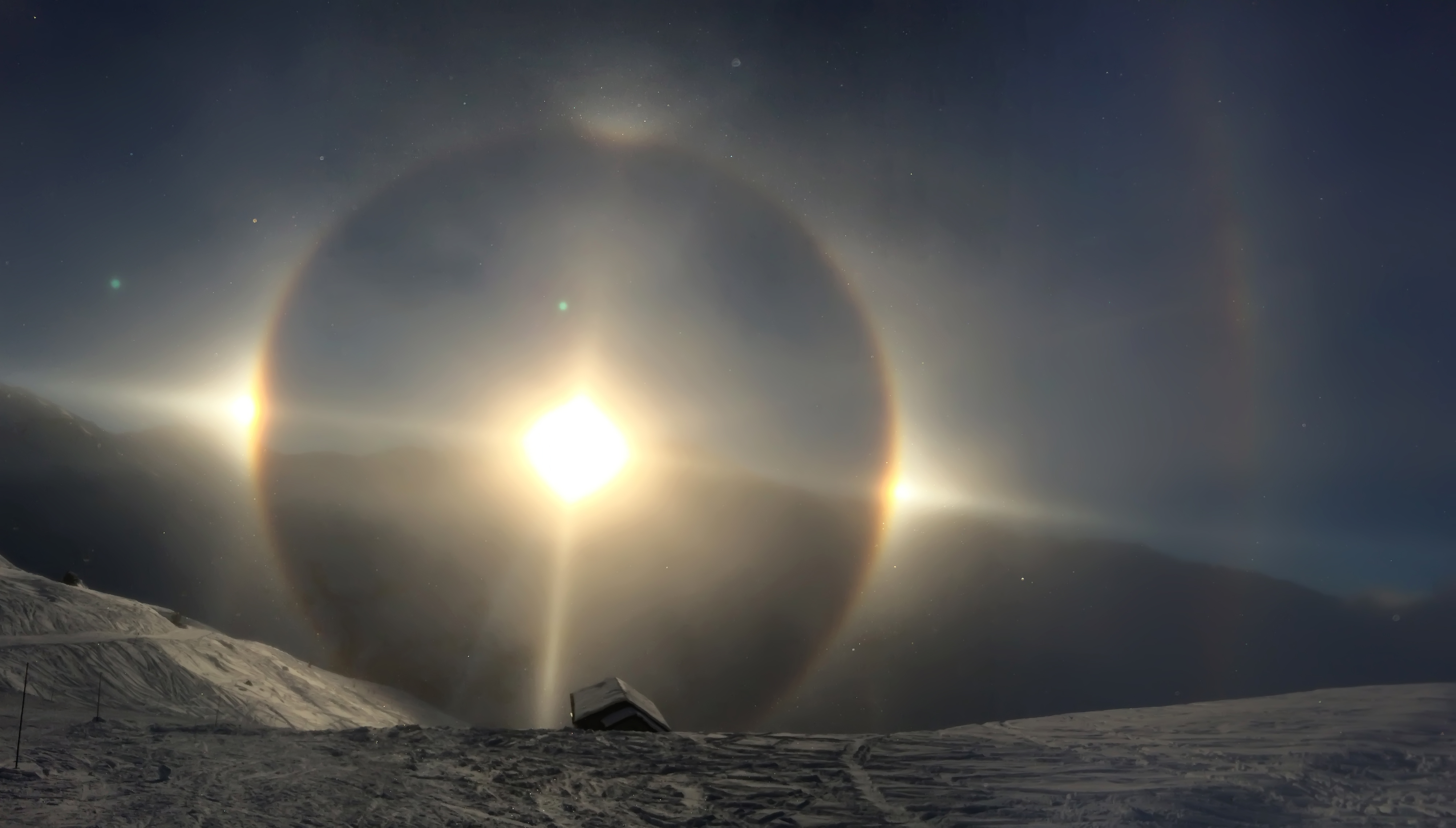
Complex halo display (22° halo, sun dogs, upper tangent arc, upper and lower Sun pillar, parhelic circle, supralateral arc) observed in Les Ménuires (elevation ≈2200 metres), Rhone-Alpes, France on January 23, 2015, during sunset at 16:30

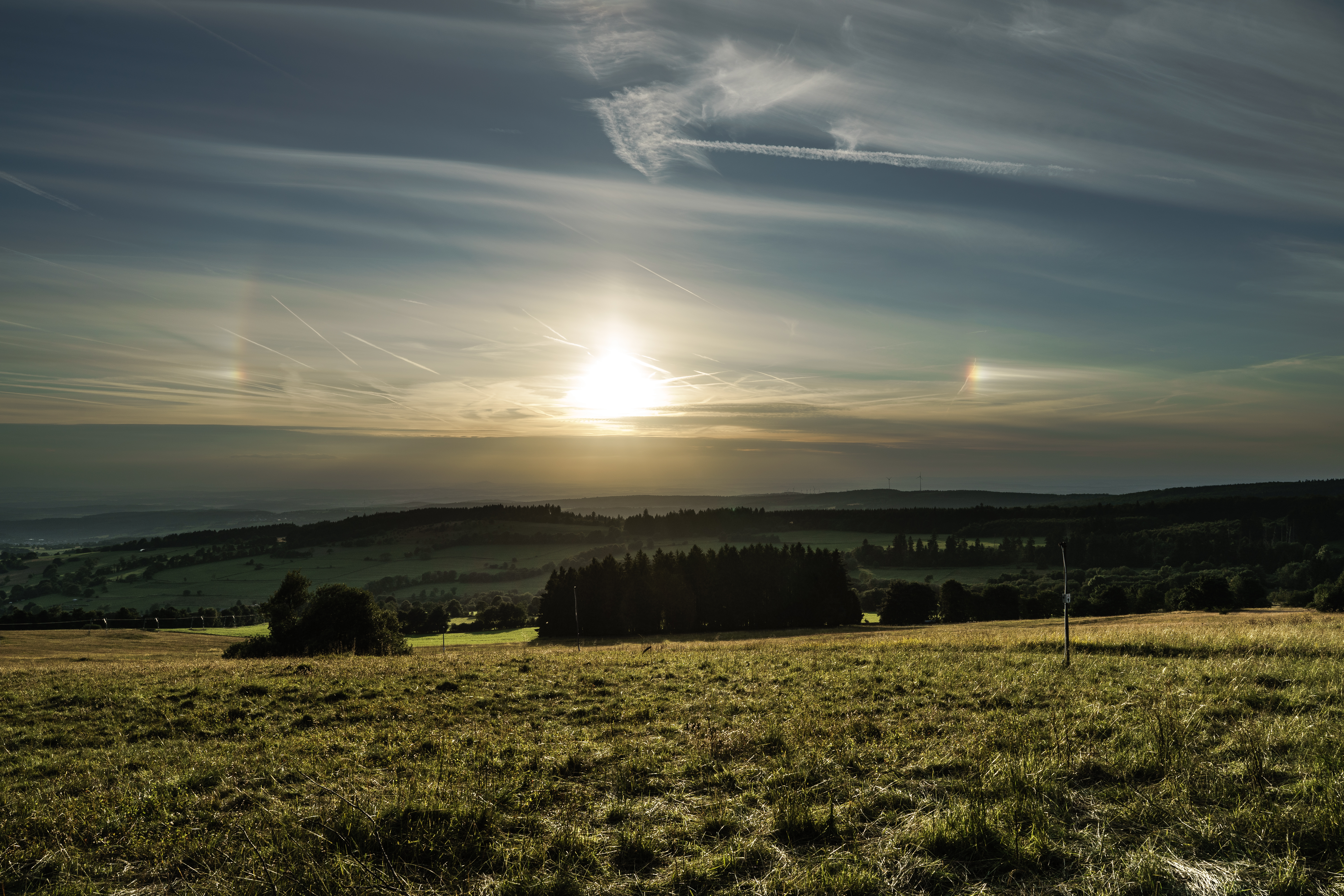
Sun with Sun dogs at Hoherodskopf / Germany - July 15, 2017

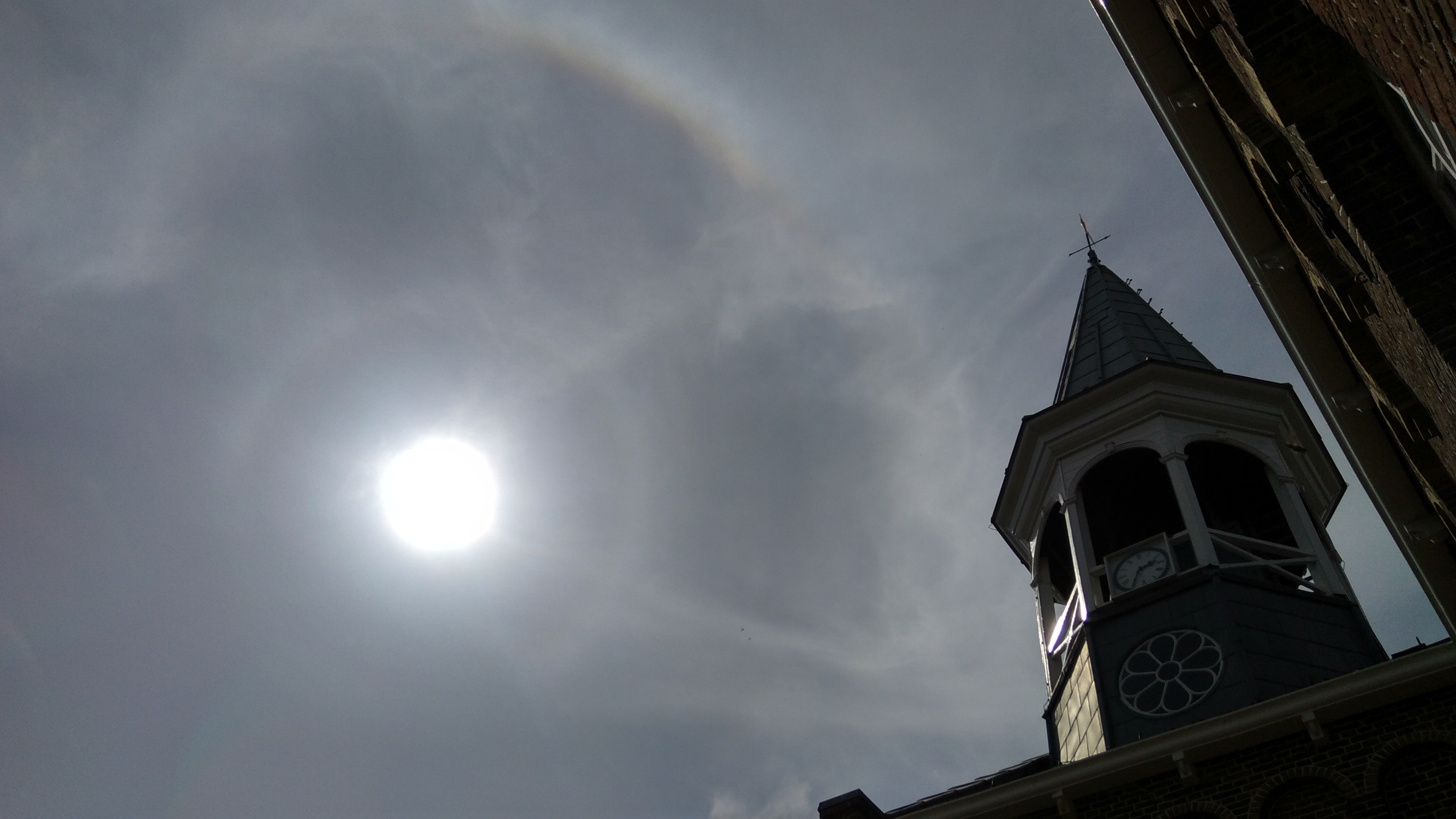
A circumscribed halo (outer ring) together with a comparatively rare 9° halo (inner ring), caused by pyramidal ice crystals. Midsland, the Netherlands, 2019.

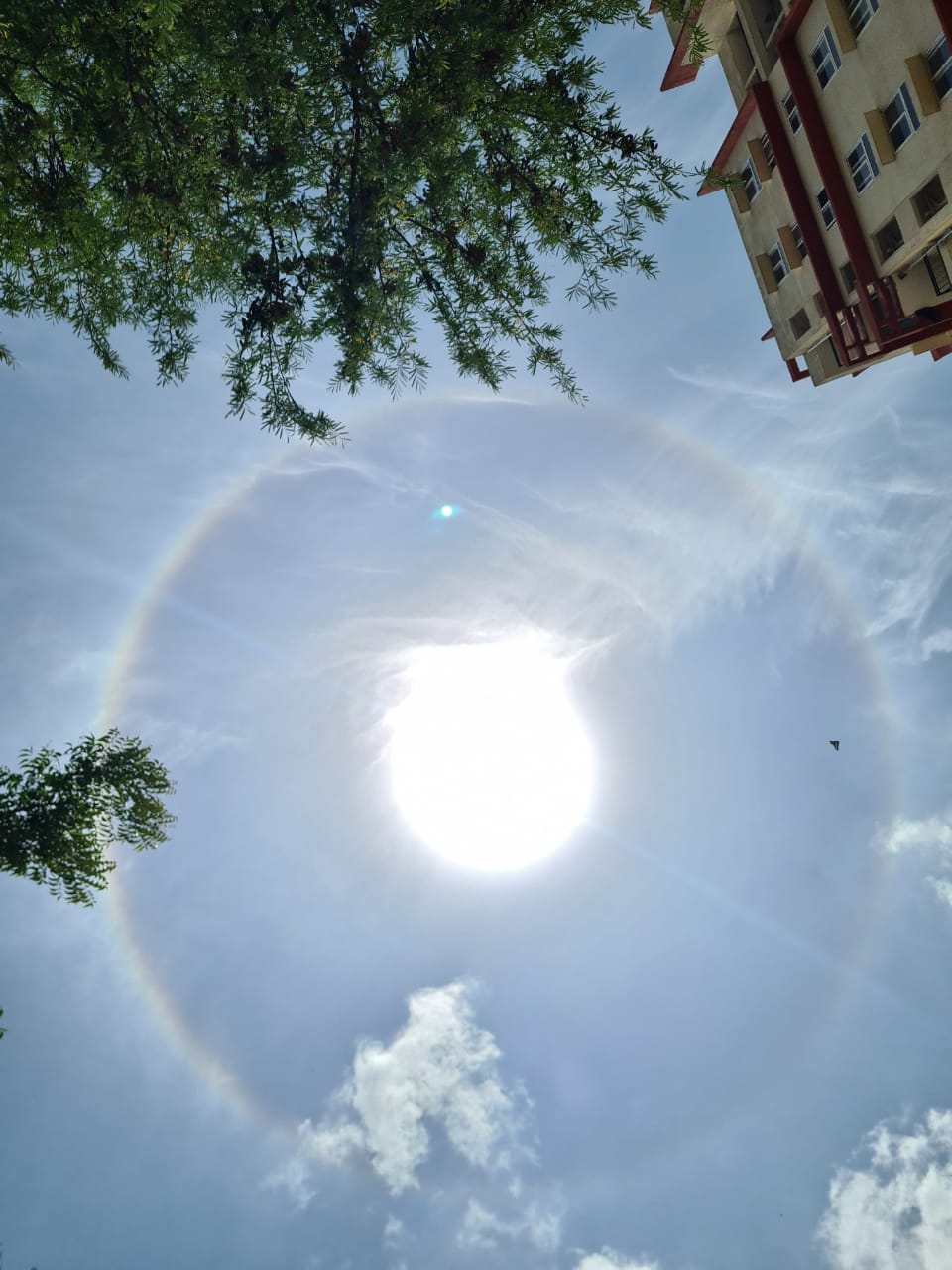
22° halo around the Sun, above VBHC Serene Town at Bangalore, India, on May 24, 2021, at 12:15 pm

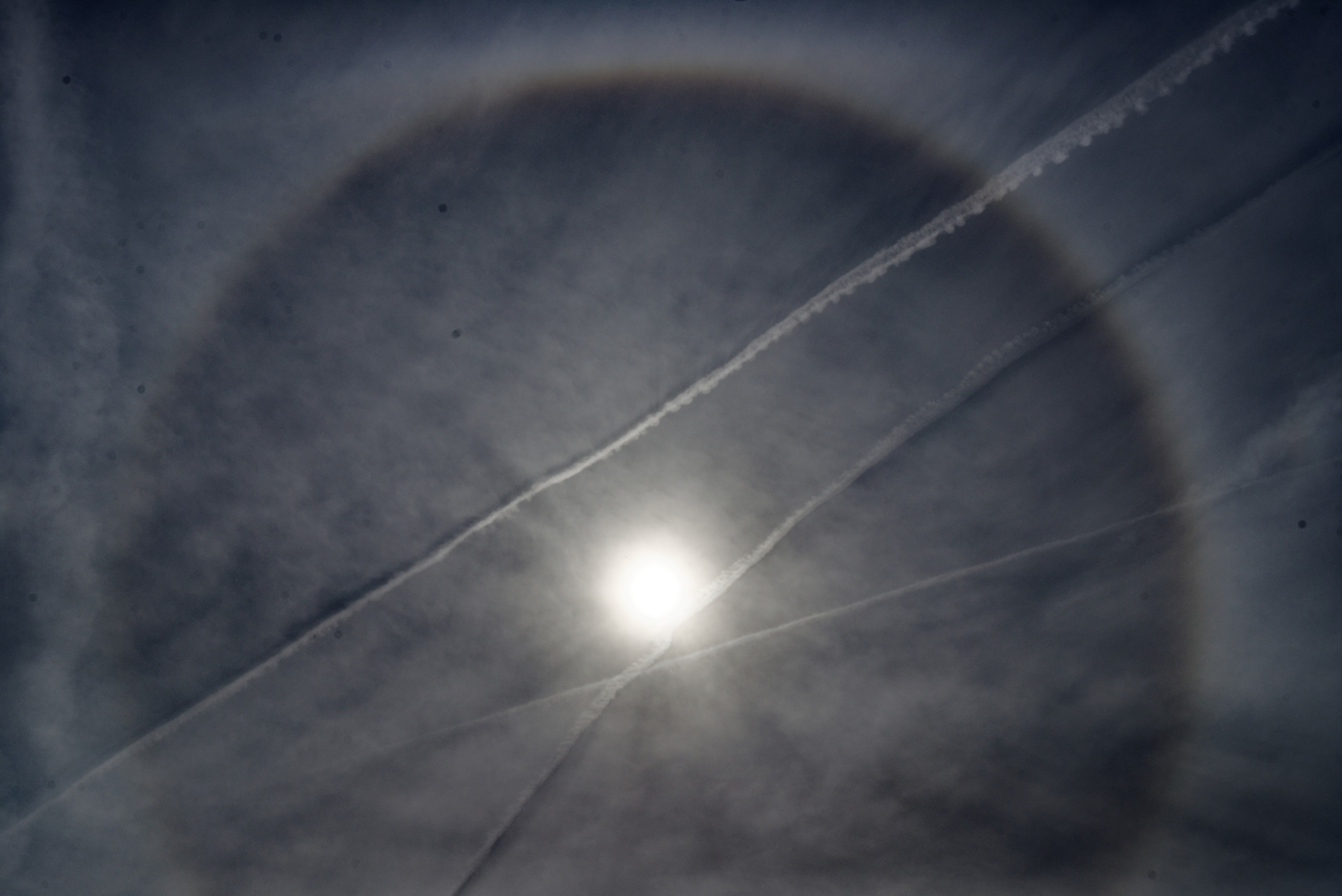
Solar halo, at Cedar Key, Florida, US on November 1, 2021, about 15:26 EST

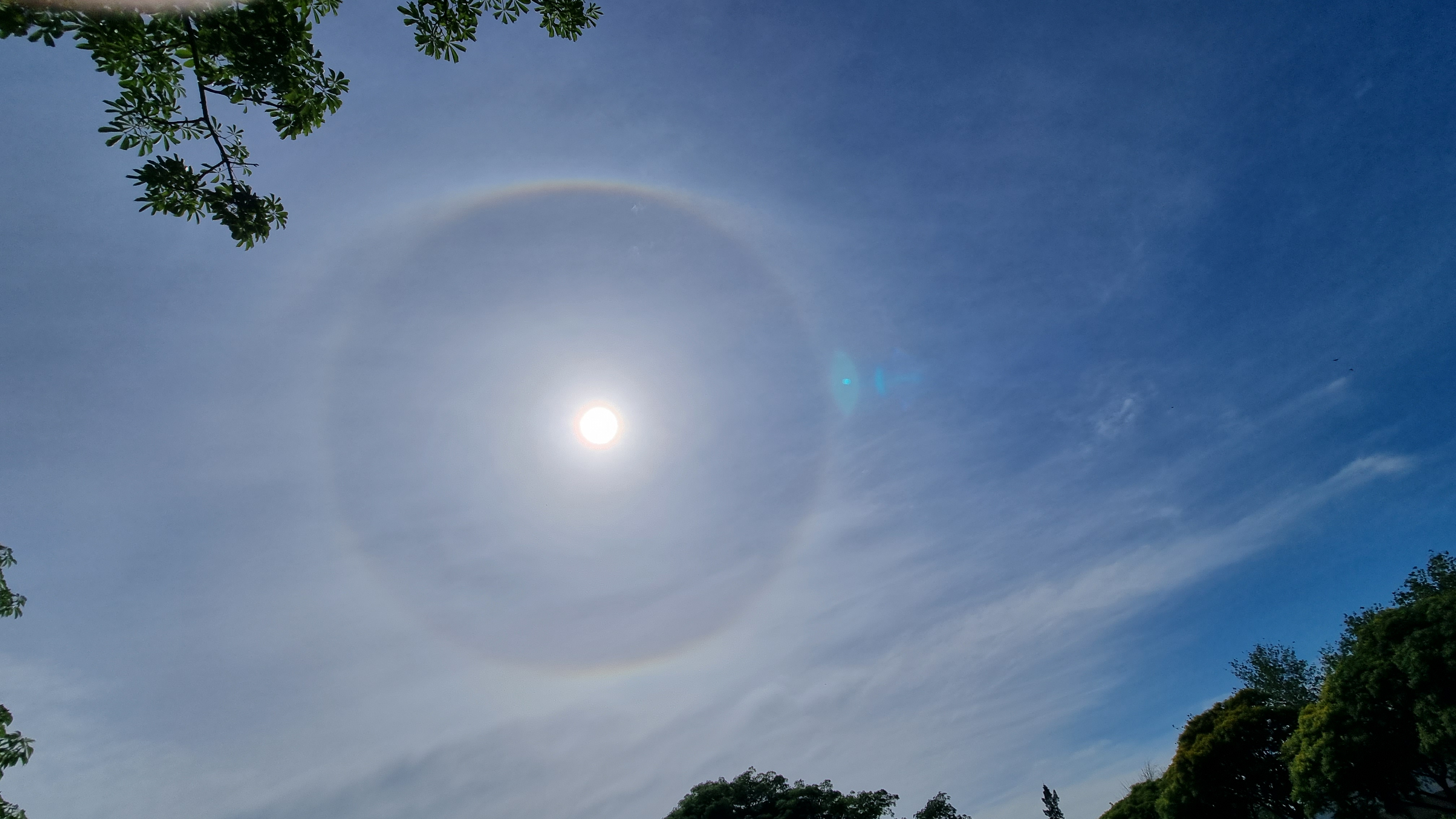
Halo around the Sun in Buenos Aires, Argentina (December 10, 2022)

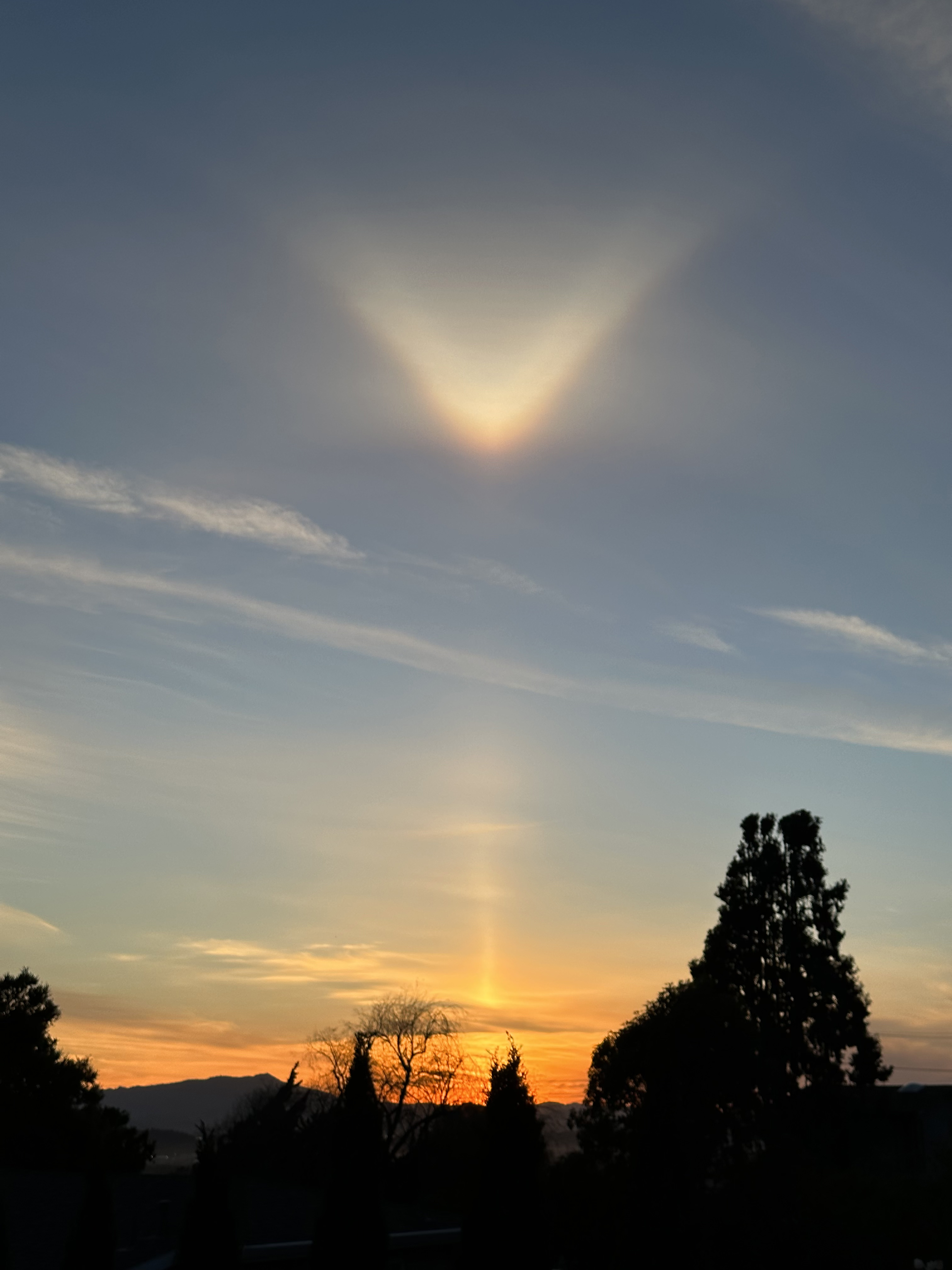
Sun pillar and upper tangent arc over the San Francisco bay. April 9, 2023.

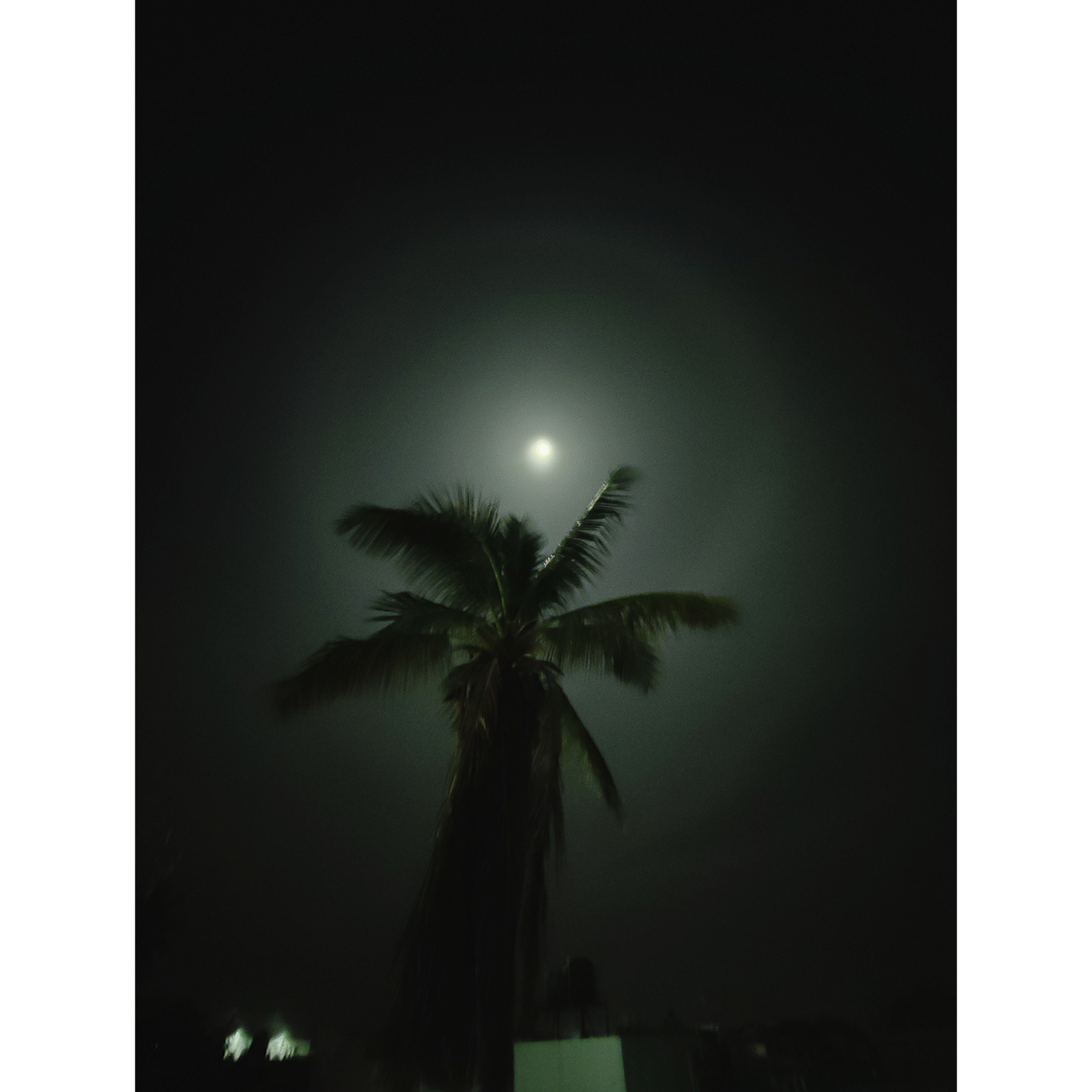
22° lunar halo behind coconut tree in Chikmagaluru on May 24, 2021

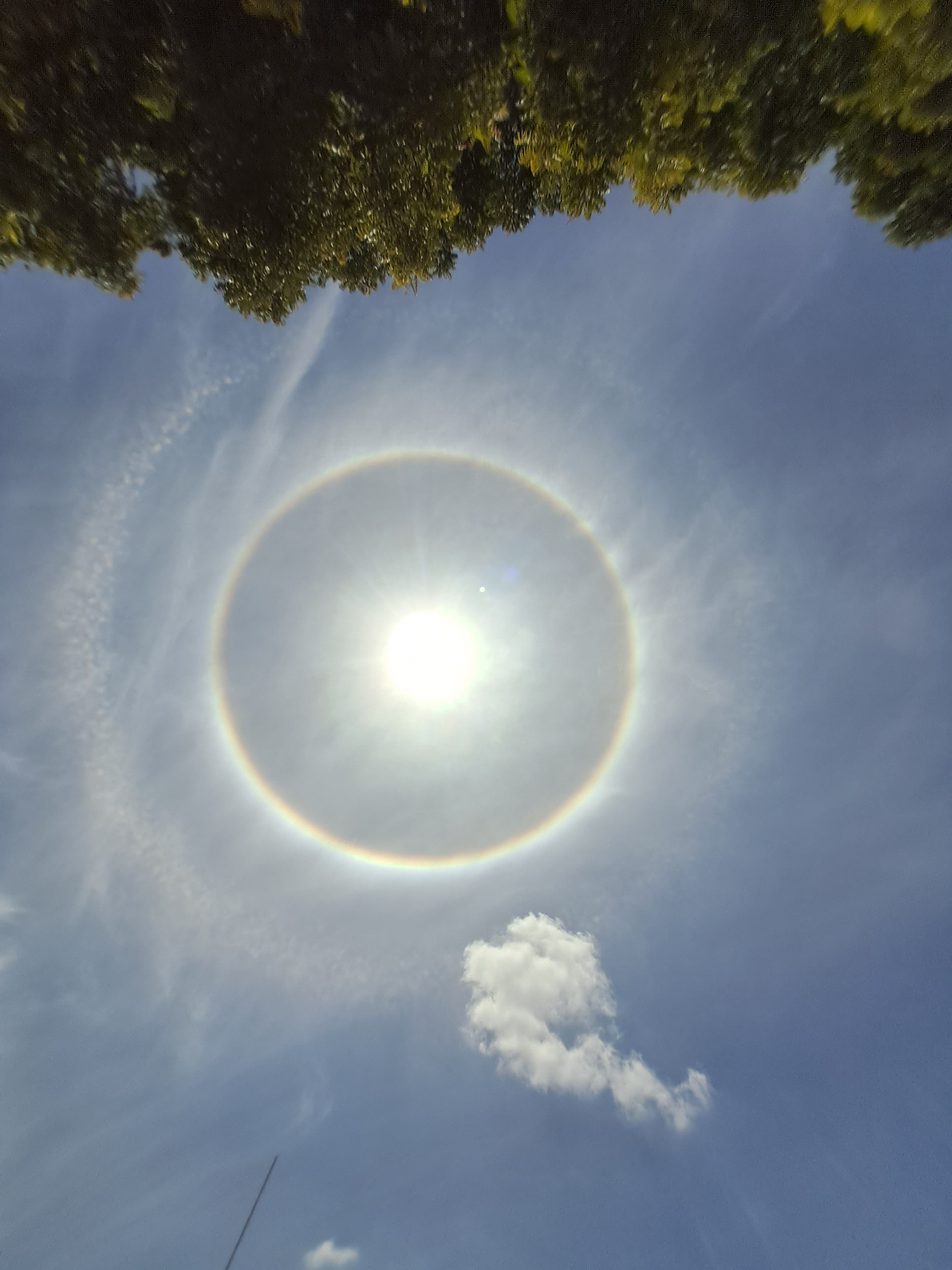
Halo around the Sun in Coimbatore, Tamil Nadu, India (25 September 2023 11:45 AM)

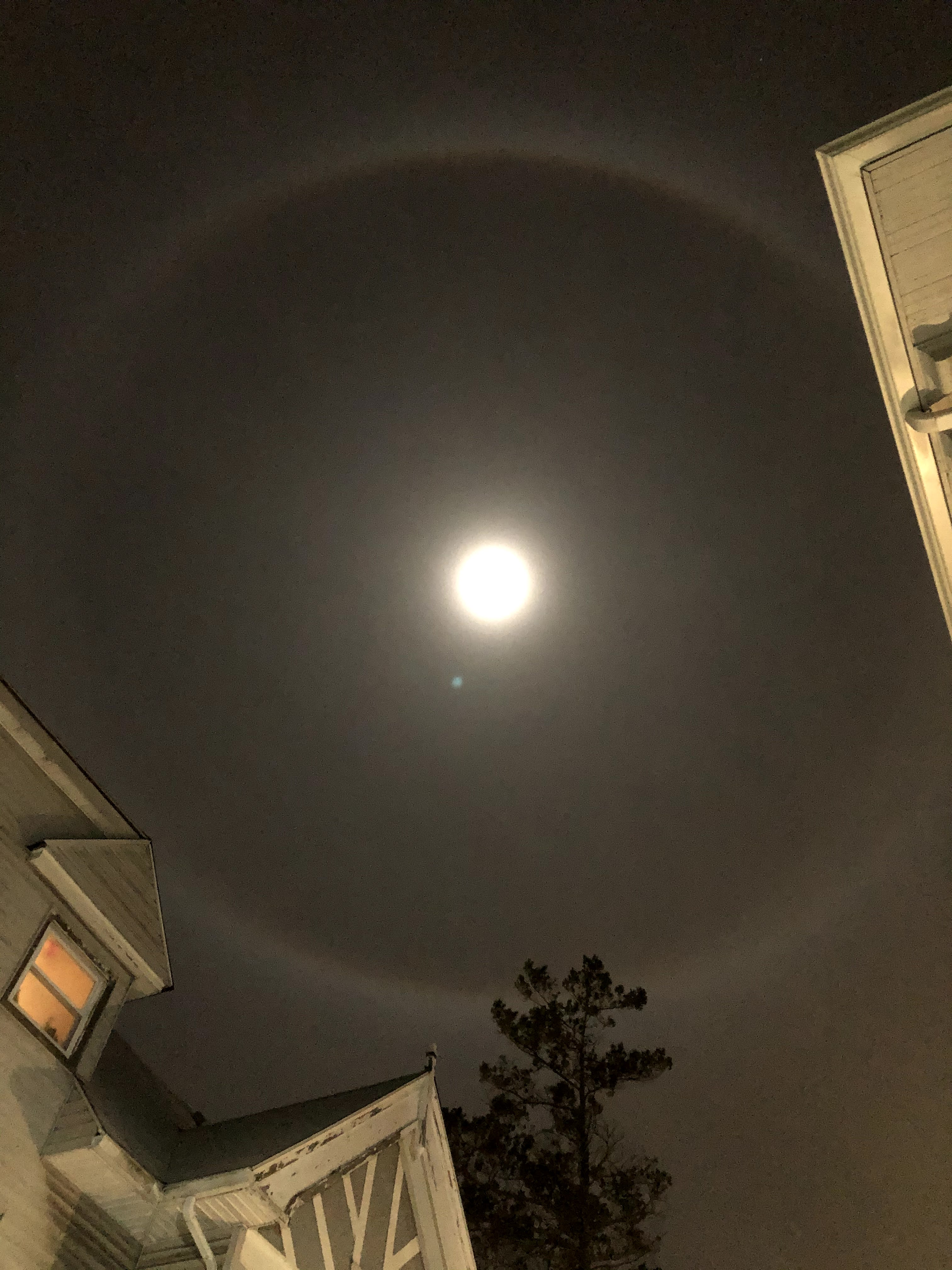
Moon with 22° halo over New York City, USA on November 30, 2020, at 01:16:28 AM EST

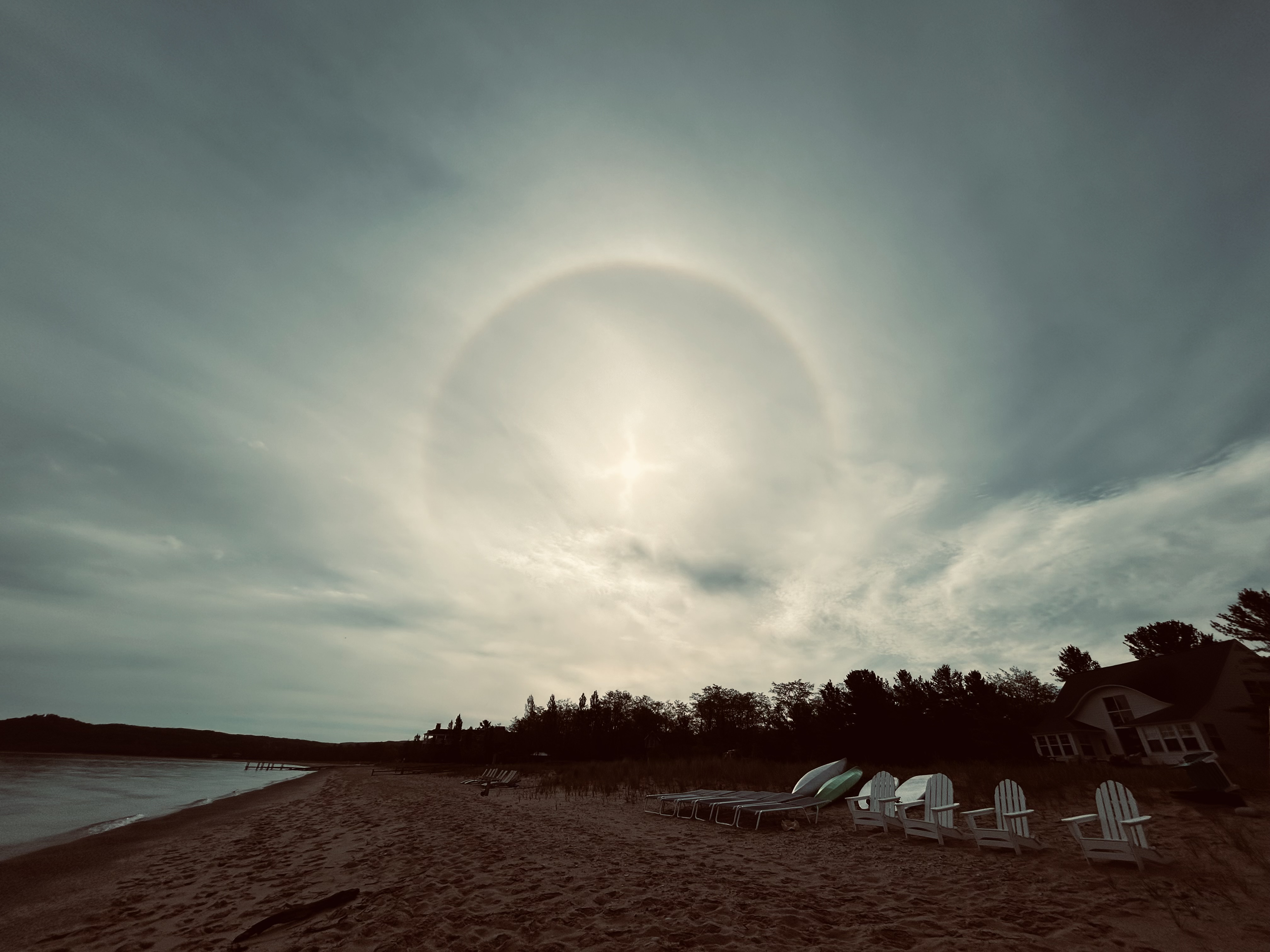
Halo around the sun in Glen Arbor, Michigan (May 28, 2024)

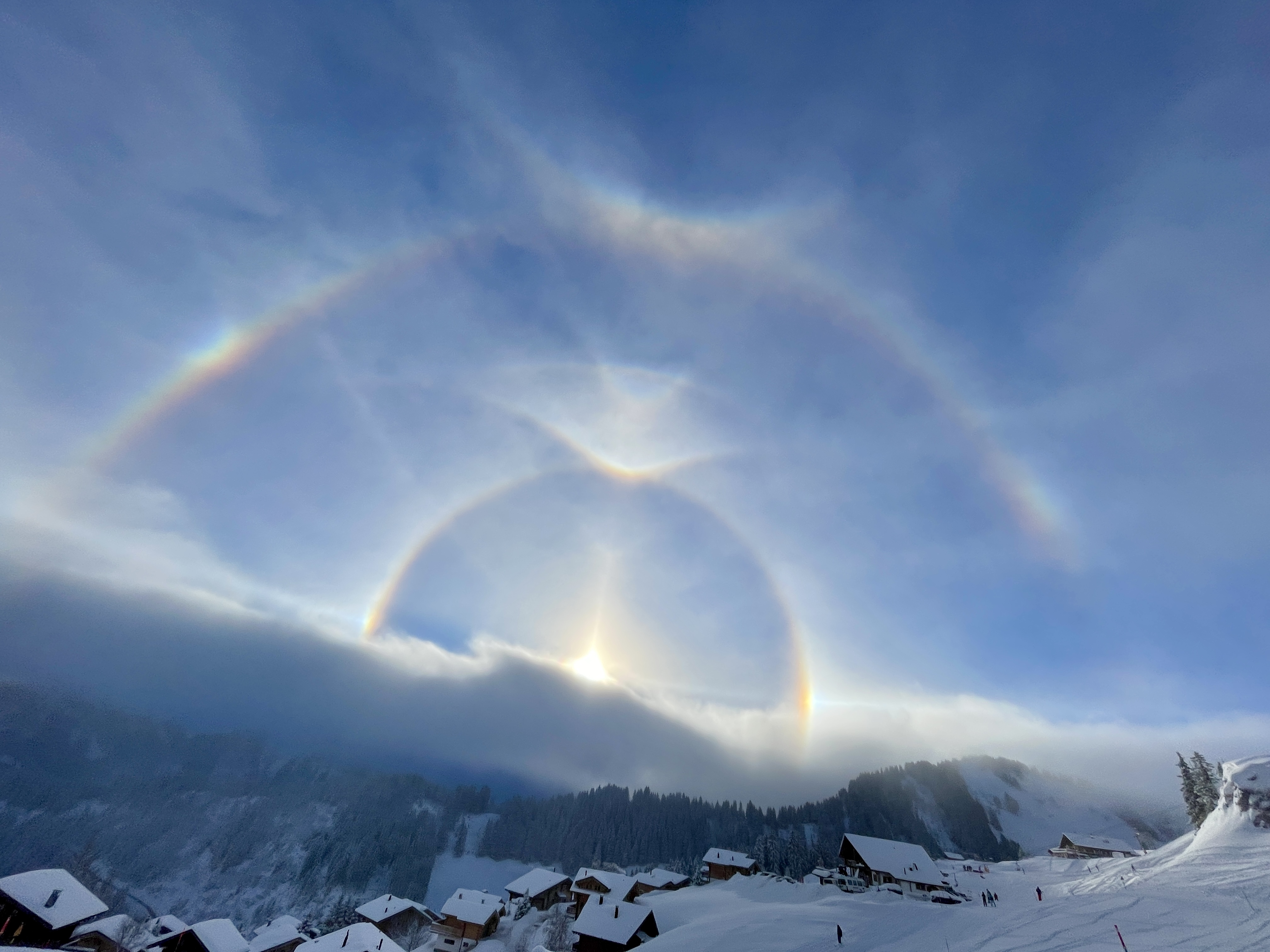
22° halo featuring a Parry arc and an upper tangent arc, with a supralateral arc featuring a circumzenithal arc. Morgins, Switzerland, January 3rd, 2025.

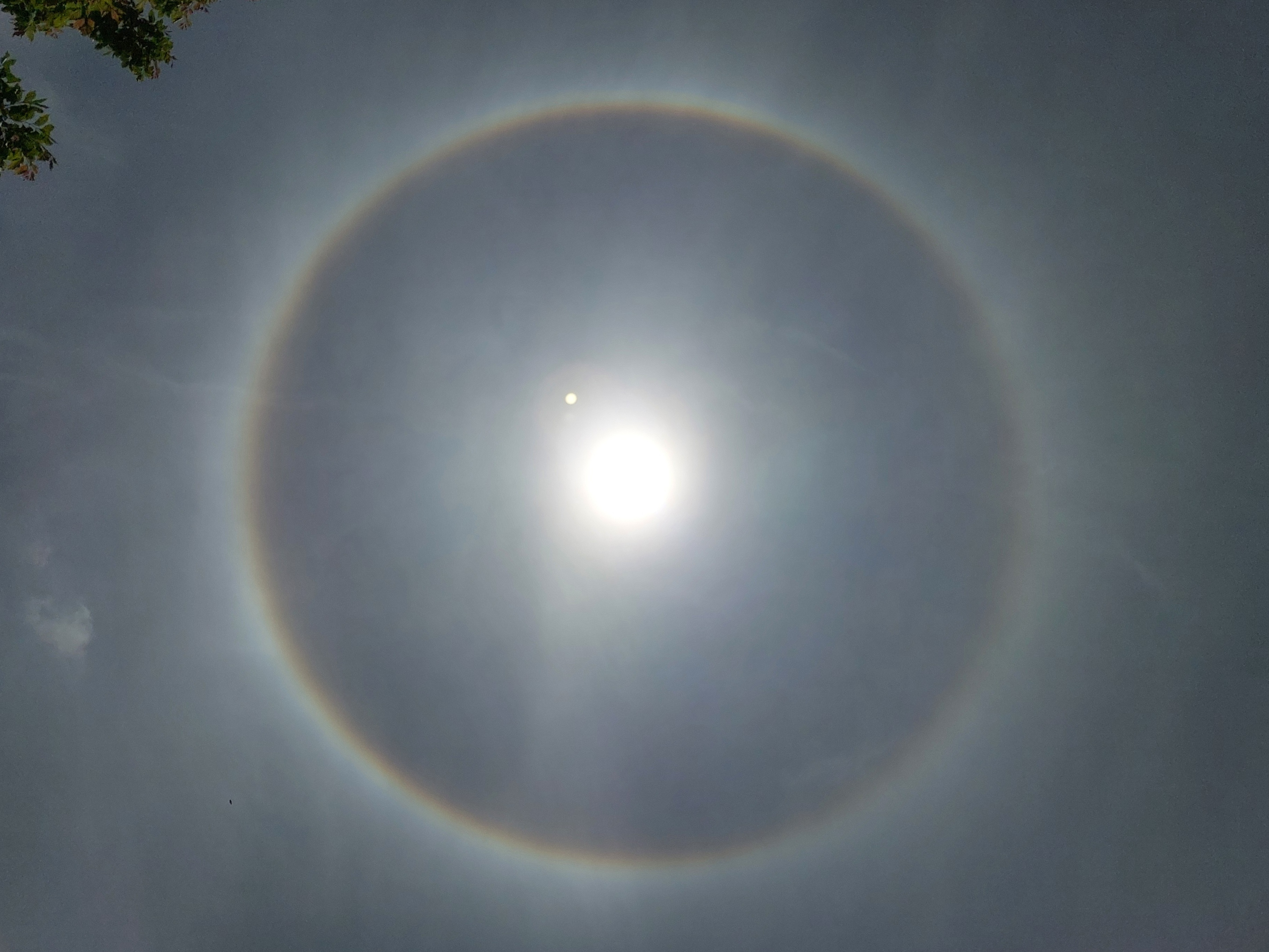
A 22° halo around the sun. Khon Kaen, Thailand, May 16th, 2026

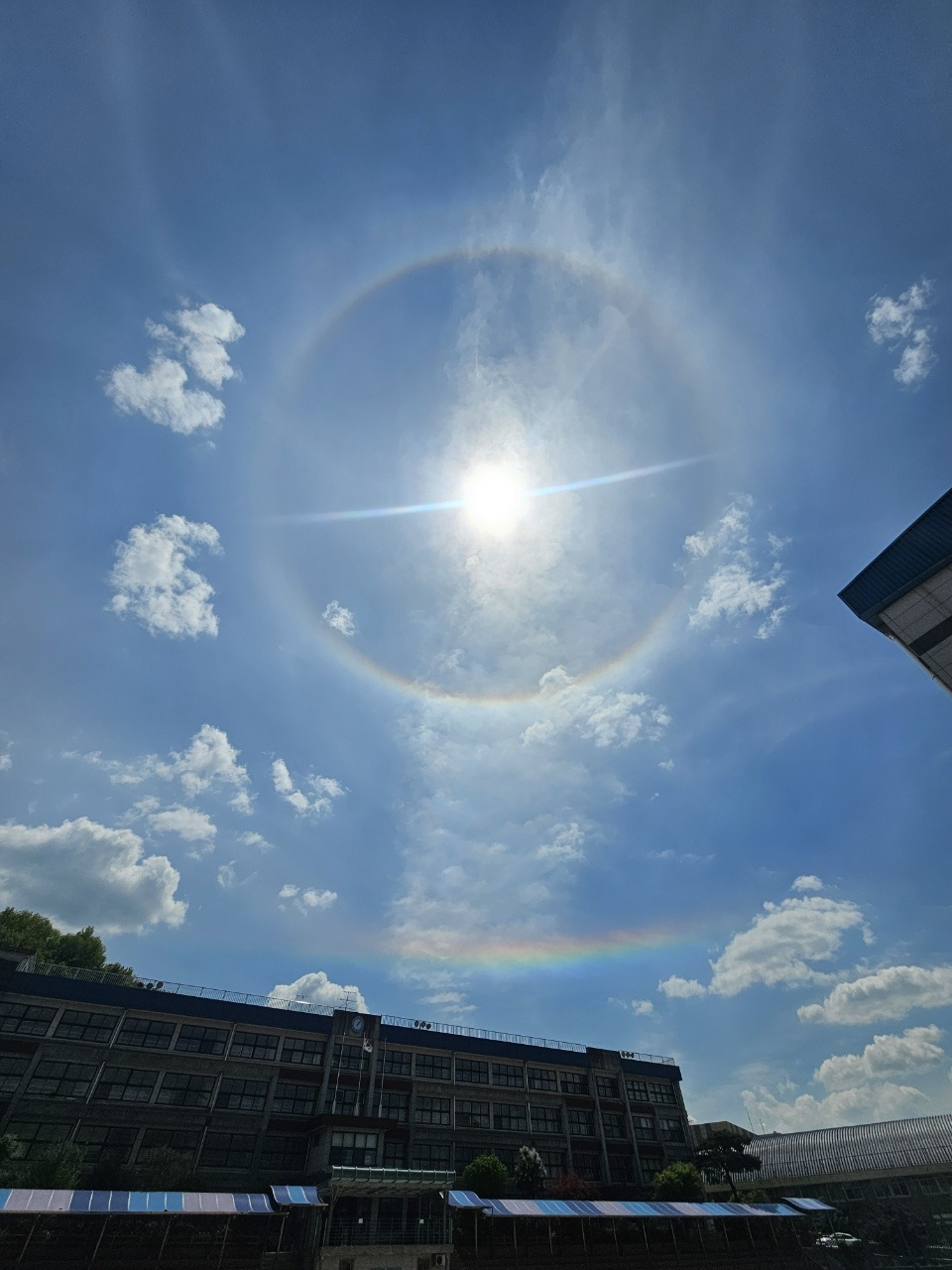
A 22° halo, circumscribed halo, circumhorizontal arc, and parhelic circle in Namyangju, Korea. (April 29th, 2026)

22° halo in Johannesburg, South Africa. November 16th, 2026.

22°Halo in Masvingo, Zimbabwe on the 19th of November 2026 at 10:30 am.

== See also ==
- 22° halo – Atmospheric optical phenomenon
- 46° halo – Atmospheric optical phenomenon
- 120° parhelion
- Anthelion – Rare optical phenomenon
- Atmospheric optics – Optical characteristics of the atmosphere
- Circumhorizontal arc – Optical phenomenon
- Circumscribed halo – Optical phenomenon
- Circumzenithal arc – Optical phenomenon arising from refraction of sunlight through ice crystals
- Corona – Optical phenomenon of the sky
- Diamond dust – Ground-level cloud of ice crystals
- False sunrise – Atmospheric optical phenomena in which the Sun appears to have risen
- Fata Morgana (mirage) – Optical phenomenon
- Glory – Halo seen about the observer's shadow
- Green flash – Meteorological optical phenomenon
- Heiligenschein – Optical phenomenon
- Infralateral arc
- Kern arc – Atmospheric optical phenomenon
- Light pillar – Reflections of a light source created by ice crystals in the air
- Liljequist parhelion – Atmospheric optical phenomenon
- Parhelic circle – Type of halo, an optical phenomenon
- Parry arc – Optical phenomenon
- Rainbow – Meteorological phenomenon
- Subhelic arc – Rare halo
- Subparhelic circle – Rare atmospheric optical phenomenon
- Subsun – Glowing spot that can be seen within clouds or haze when observed from above
- Sun dog – Atmospheric optical phenomenon
- Supralateral arc
- Tangent arc – Atmospheric optical phemonenon
