= Subhelic arc =

Rare halo

A subhelic arc is a rare halo, formed by internal reflection through ice crystals, that curves upwards from the horizon and touches the tricker arc above the anthelic point. Subhelic arcs result from ray entrance and exit through prism end faces with two intermediate internal reflections.

== Formation ==
A subhelic arc is formed when sun rays enter one end face of an ice crystal in singly oriented columns and Parry columns, reflect off two of the crystals side faces, and exits the crystal through the opposite end face. The ray leaves the crystal at the exact opposite angle, resulting in a net deviation angle of 120°, the angle for the formation of 120° parhelia.

The subhelic arc touches the top of the tricker arc, an indication the two have closely related ray paths.

The subhelic arc crosses the parhelic circle at an acute angle, and at a sun elevation of 27° it passes exactly through the 120° parhelion.

== See also ==
- Infralateral arc
- Wegener arc
