= 46° halo =

Atmospheric optical phenomenon

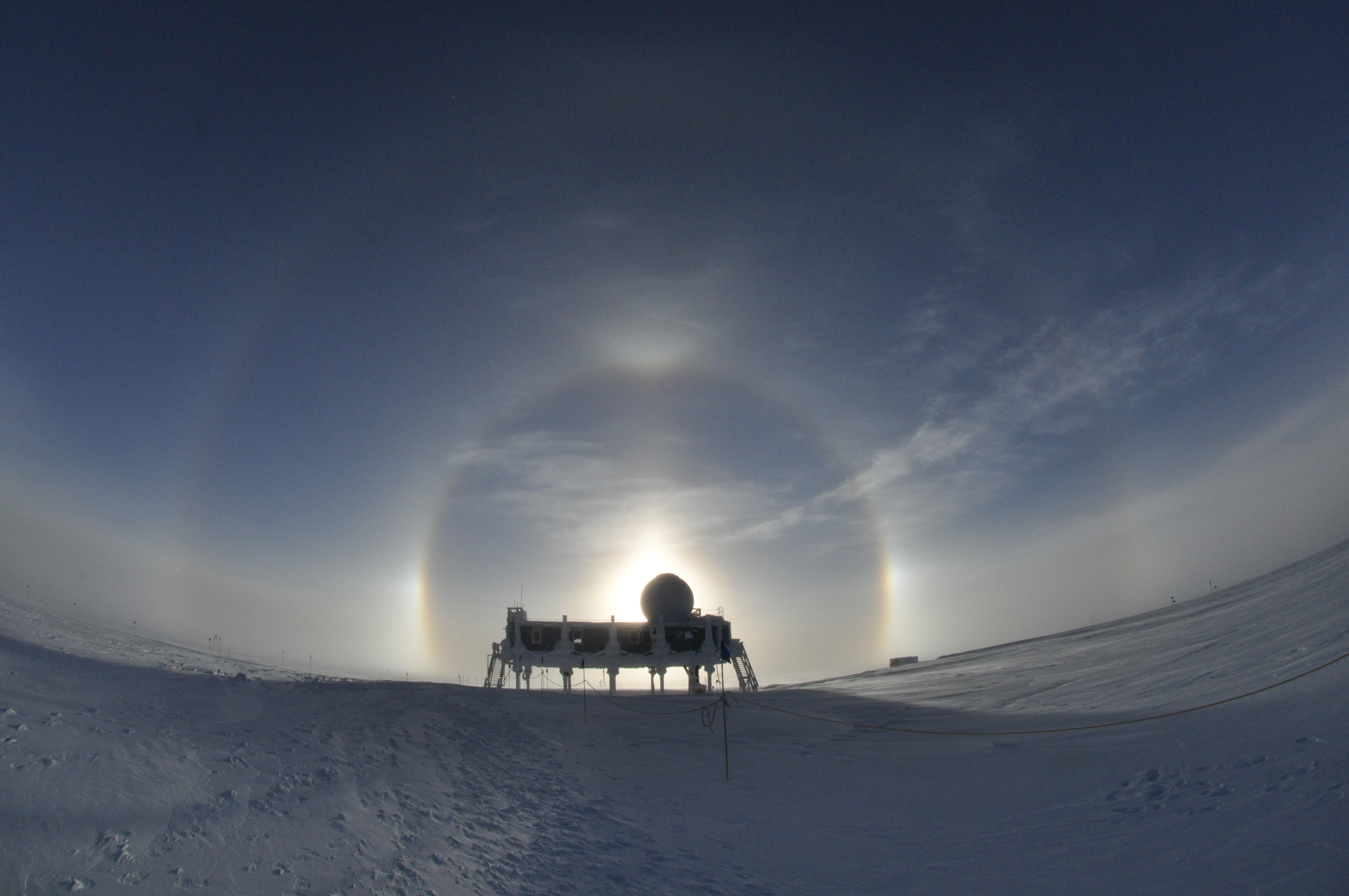
Sun dogs with a larger and fainter 46° halo and a 22° halo with an upper tangent arc

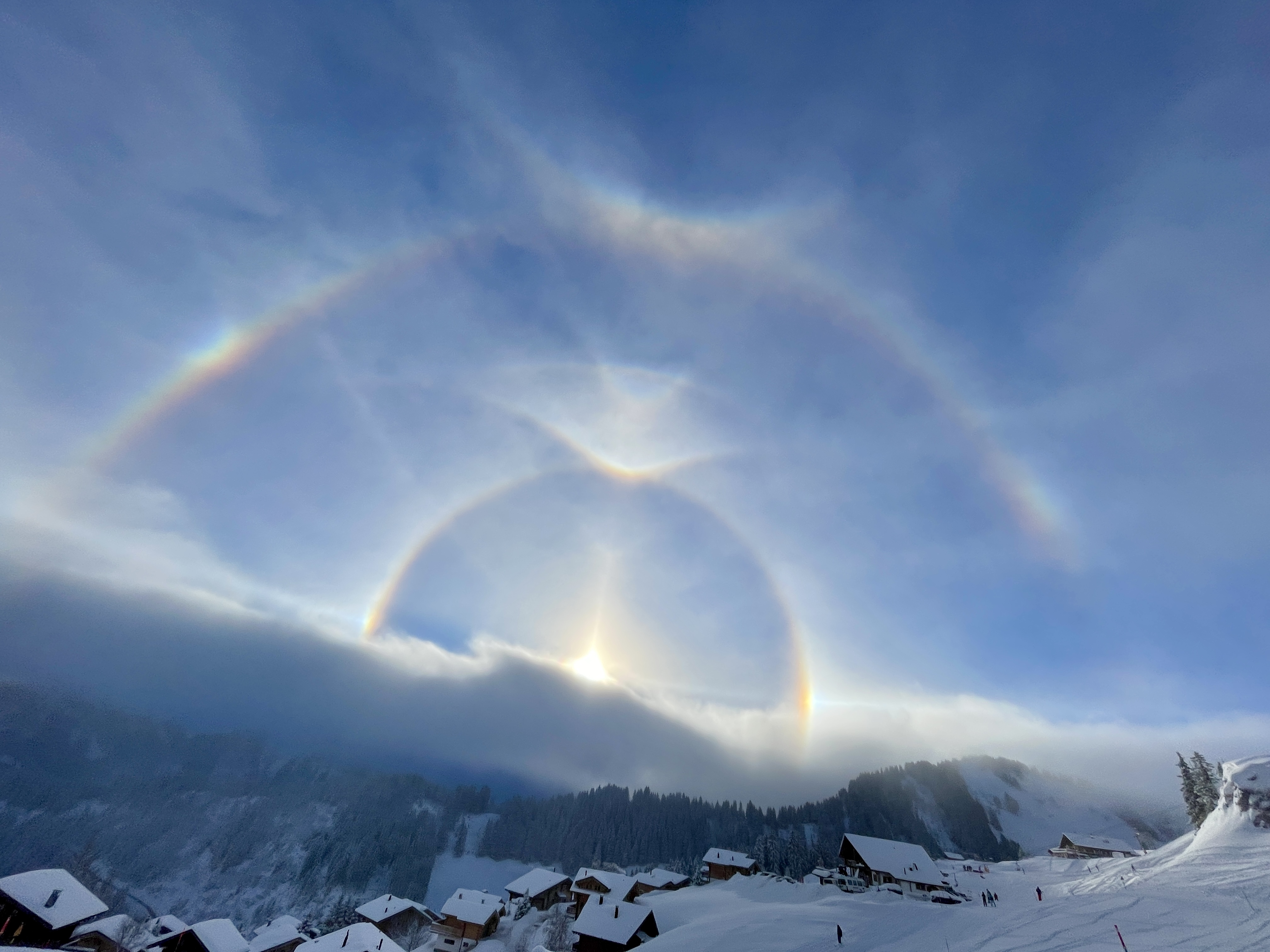
The 46° halo is often confused with the supralateral arc (seen here with a circumzenithal arc, surrounding a 22° halo with a tangent arc and a Parry arc).

A 46° halo is a rare atmospheric optical phenomenon that consists of a halo with an apparent radius of approximately 46° around the Sun. At solar elevations of 15–27°, 46° halos are often confused with the less rare and more colourful supralateral and infralateral arcs, which cross the parhelic circle at about 46° to the left and right of the sun.

The 46° halo is similar to, but much larger and fainter than, the more common 22° halo. The 46° halo forms when sunlight enters randomly oriented hexagonal ice crystals through a prism face and exits through a hexagonal base. The 90° inclination between the two faces of the crystals causes the colours of the 46° halo to be more widely dispersed than those of the 22° halo. In addition, as many rays are deflected at larger angles than the angle of minimum deviation, the outer edge of the halo is more diffuse.

To tell the difference between a 46° halo and the infralateral or supralateral arcs, one should carefully observe sun elevation and the fluctuating shapes and orientations of the arcs. The supralateral arc always touches the circumzenithal arc, while the 46° halo only achieves this when the sun is located 15–27° over the horizon, leaving a gap between the two at other elevations. In contrast, supralateral arcs cannot form when the Sun is over 32°, so a halo in the region of 46° is always a 46° halo at higher elevations. If the Sun is near the zenith, however, circumhorizontal or infralateral arcs are located 46° under the Sun and can be confused with the 46° halo.
