= Infralateral arc =

An infralateral arc (or lower lateral tangent arc) is a rare halo, an optical phenomenon appearing similar to a rainbow under a white parhelic circle. Together with the supralateral arc they are always located outside the seldom observable 46° halo, but in contrast to supralateral arcs, infralateral arcs are always located below the parhelic circle.

The shape of an infralateral arc varies with the elevation of the Sun. Between sunrise and before the observed Sun reaches about 50° over Earth's horizon, two infralateral arcs are located on either side (e.g. lateral) of the 46° halo, their convex apexes lying tangental to the 46° halo. As the observed Sun reaches above 68°, the two arcs unite into a single concave arc tangent to the 46° halo vertically under the Sun.

Infralateral arcs form when sunlight enters horizontally oriented, rod-shaped hexagonal ice crystals through a hexagonal base and exits through one of the prism sides. Infralateral arcs occur about once a year. They are often observed together with circumscribed halos and upper tangent arcs.

== See also ==
- Circumzenithal arc
- Tangent arc
- Parry arc
