= Olaus Petri =

Swedish clergyman and reformer (1493–1552)

Venerable Olaus Petri
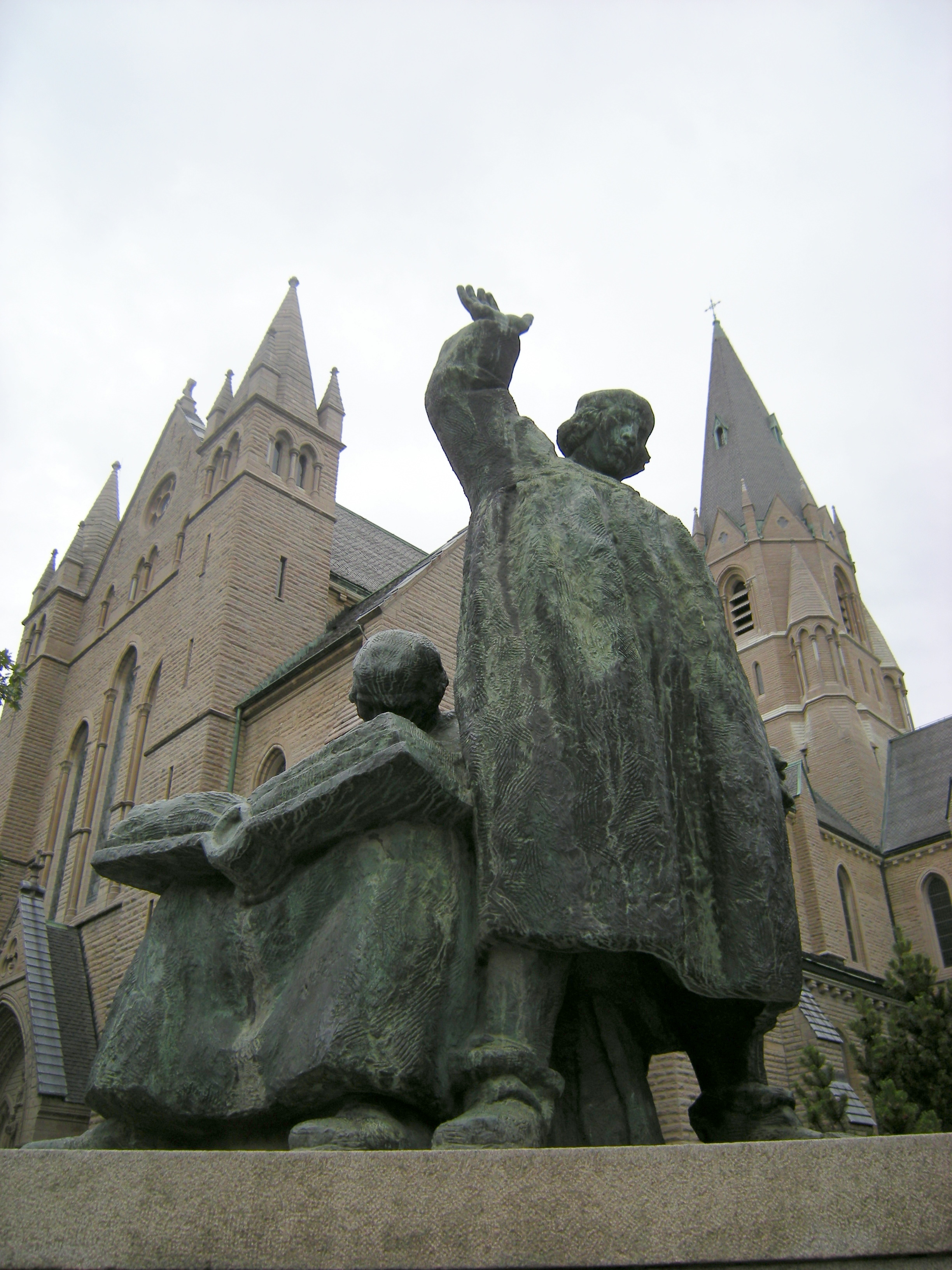
- Statue of Olaus and Laurentius Petri in Örebro, Sweden

Religious and confessor
- Born: 1493; Örebro, Sweden
- Died: 19 April 1552 (aged 58 or 59); Stockholm, Sweden
- Venerated in: Evangelical Lutheran Church in America
- Major shrine: Storkyrkan in Stockholm
- Feast: 19 April

Olof Petersson (6 January 1493 – 19 April 1552), better known under the Latin form of his name, Olaus Petri (or less commonly, Olavus Petri), was a clergyman, writer, judge, and major contributor to the Protestant Reformation in Sweden. His brother, Laurentius Petri (Lars Petersson), became the first Evangelical Lutheran Archbishop of Sweden.

== Early life ==
Born in Örebro, in south-central Sweden, and the son of Peter Olofsson (a local blacksmith) and Kristina Larsdotter, Olaus Petri learned to read and write at the local Carmelite monastery. He then went to the capital and studied at the University of Uppsala, studying theology and German. Later, he attended the University of Leipzig until 1516, and finally finished his education and received a Master's degree at the University of Wittenberg in February 1518. While in Wittenberg with his younger brother Lars, Olaus met with and was influenced by the main characters of the German reformation, Philipp Melanchthon and Martin Luther.

== Career ==
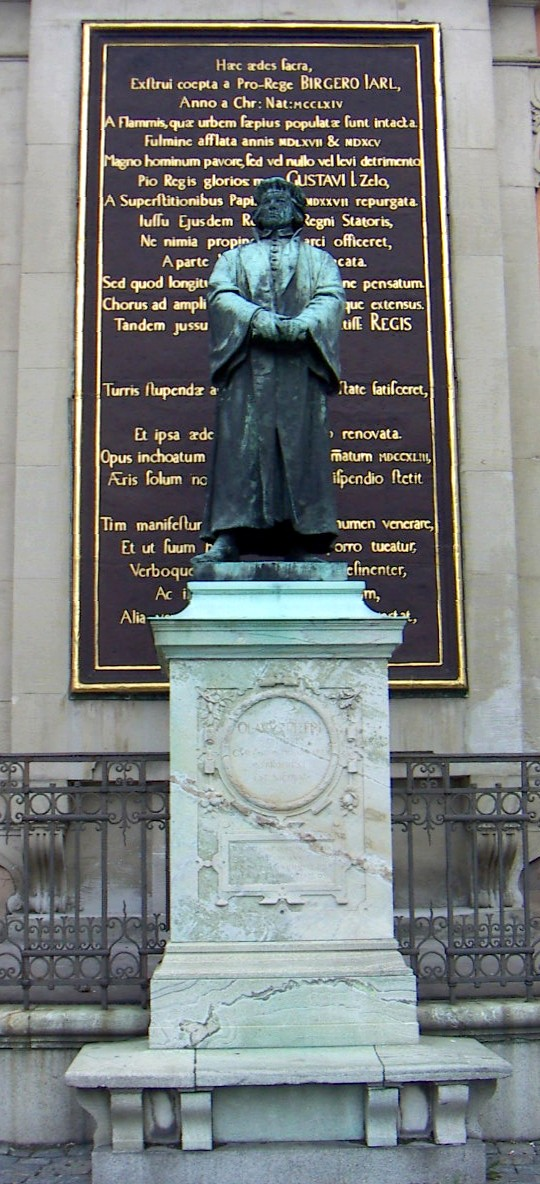
Petri outside Storkyrkan, Stockholm

Both Petri brothers returned to Sweden in 1519, nearly dying as their ship ran aground on Gotland island during a storm. They remained on Gotland for a while, with Olaus preaching and assisting the local priest, Soren Norby, and Lars teaching at the local school. In 1520, Olaus returned to Strängnäs on the mainland, accepting ordination as a deacon and serving bishop Mattias Gregersson Lilje as secretary, chancellor of the Diocese of Strängnäs, canon of the Strängnäs Cathedral and dean of the cathedral school.

Olaus accompanied Mattias to Stockholm and attended the tumultuous crowning of Danish King Christian II, who had captured Stockholm and held it for about a year until returning to Denmark, where he was soon deposed and replaced by his uncle, who became King Frederick I of Denmark. Meanwhile, at the notorious Stockholm Bloodbath in early November, King Christian violated his promises of a general amnesty for the Sture party, and during the post-coronation festivities arrested and executed 80–90 churchmen and secular Swedish nobles, including Bishop Mattias. When Olaus expressed his outrage, he was almost executed as well, but a German who had seen him in Wittenberg identified Olaus as a fellow German and thus saved his life. King Christian tried to appoint his friend and bishop of Odense, Jens Andersen Beldenak, to the now-vacant Strängnäs bishopric, but both Danes soon returned to Denmark, and the scholar-priest Laurentius Andreae, who had been named archdeacon in 1520, ran the diocese.

The massacre provoked the Swedish War of Liberation, including the election and crowning of Gustav Vasa as King of Sweden, in Strängnäs in 1523. Olaus (whose father died in 1521, after which he and his brother had joined the insurgents under Vasa's leadership) attended the coronation, swore fealty to his monarch, and soon became the kingdom's chancellor. A year later, Olaus was appointed Stockholm's town secretary and moved to the capital, where he also served as a judge (despite a lack of specific legal training) and town councillor.

Olaus became known for his advocacy of Lutheranism and criticism of the prevailing Roman Catholicism. In October 1524, the Uppsala Cathedral's chapter excommunicated both brothers on grounds of heresy. They remained, however, confident in the new Swedish king's strong support. In 1525, Olaus married, as Lutheran practice permitted, and also implemented another of Luther's ideas by having the mass sung in Swedish for the first time. Throughout this period, Olaus was also involved in scholarly endeavours, including translating Lutheran works into Swedish. In 1526, Olaus published the first Swedish translation of the New Testament, and also published a catechism in Swedish.

The Petri brothers' efforts to teach their king and fellow Swedes about Luther's ideas bore fruit the following year, as the Diet of Västerås declared Sweden Lutheran. In 1531, Olaus published a slightly simplified version of the Catholic mass in Swedish. Vasa also confirmed the kingdom's Lutheran alignment in 1531 by appointing Lars (who had been ordained a priest in 1527 and had married a daughter of the king's cousin that year) Archbishop of Uppsala, in part because the Pope refused to acknowledge the consecration of his candidate as bishop of Strängnäs, Magnus Sommar (1528–36; ultimately deposed and forced into retirement by the king).

Contemporaries described Olaus as energetic and pushy, particularly about matters in which he believed strongly. He also wrote a Swedish hymnal, liturgical manual, and many homiletic and polemic tracts. In fact, some consider the brothers and their ally Laurentius Andreae (who had physically crowned Gustav Vasa king in 1523) responsible for most early Swedish printed literature. Olaus also wrote a Chronicle of Sweden, which, despite some historical inaccuracies, contains many interesting facts and anecdotes and remains an important historical document. Olaus also had an important part in translating the whole Bible into the vernacular; the Gustav Vasa Bible was completed circa 1541.

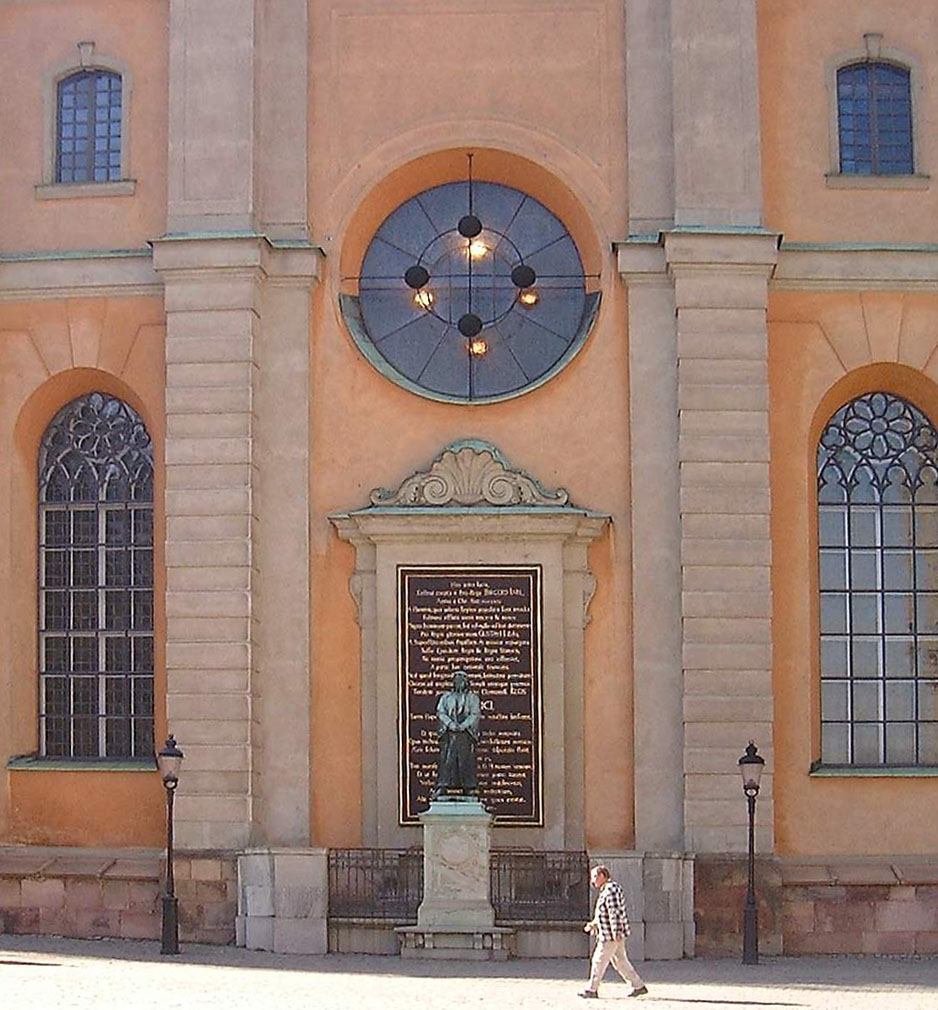
Statue of Olaus Petri in front of Storkyrkan

In 1539, Olaus Petri was ordained a priest, as permitted under Luther's reforms, and perhaps influenced by the Sun dog phenomenon of 20 April 1535, which caused Olaus to commission the mystical painting Vädersolstavlan and preach some apocalyptic sermons. However, shortly after his ordination, Olaus' relationship with King Gustav deteriorated sharply. Olaus was arrested and put on trial for treason, supposedly because he had learned about a conspiracy against the King during confession and had not revealed it. One historian suggests that Olaus' writings criticizing the King's harsh punishments and taxation policies contributed to the criminal trial. King Gustav also wanted to control the church, while Olaus distrusted the king's autocratic tendencies and supported religious self-governance. After Olaus Petri and Laurentius Andreae were found guilty on 2 January 1540, both received death sentences, and even his brother Lars signed the judgment. However, after much bargaining and many requests, friends managed to get both clergymen released on bail (Stockholm's merchants contributing to pay the stiff fines), although clearly their political careers had ended.

Olaus received a royal pardon in 1542, possibly as a reward for completing the massive biblical translation project, and in that year was appointed inspector over Stockholm's schools. The following year, he was promoted to dean of St. Nicholas' Church (Storkyrkan) in Stockholm, and fulfilled that priestly position during the final nine years of his life.

== Death and legacy ==
Olaus Petri was buried at Storkyrkan, which became the national cathedral (supplanting Uppsala Cathedral) two centuries later. Since 1898, a large plaque and statue outside Storkyrkan have commemorated the reformer. His younger brother Lars survived him by two decades, completing the Swedish church's alignment with Lutheran (contrasted with Calvinist) reformed practices.

In 1616, long after his death, the Rule for Judges' Associations was published, which is now thought to have been written circa 1520–1540 and has long been attributed to Olaus Petri. These 42 general rules, a mixture of common law and statutes, have formed the basis of Scandinavian legal traditions, particularly in Sweden and Finland. In the law of Finland, they are always included in the introduction section of legal codices, despite never having been enacted as binding law. Although some aspects seem outdated (particularly overt religious references), Olaus' twin values of legal certainty, equity, and justice remain important to Nordic legal scholarship and practice. Part of the problem in assessing his life, however, is that accounts of the trial which ended his legal career were also published long after his death by Vasa's chronicler, Erik Jöransson Tegel.

The Evangelical Lutheran Church in America remembers the brothers jointly with a liturgical commemoration on 19 April, the anniversary of his death.

Olaus Petri is the main character of August Strindberg's play Master Olof (Swedish title: Mäster Olof), the five-hour-long première of which opened on 30 December 1881.

His collected works (Samlade skrifter av Olavus Petri) were published in Uppsala (1913–1917).

== See also ==
- Foundation of Modern Sweden
