= Laurentius Andreae =

Swedish Lutheran clergyman and scholar

Laurentius Andreae (Swedish: Lars Andersson ) (c. 1470 – 14 April 1552) was a Swedish Lutheran clergyman and scholar who is acknowledged as one of his country's preeminent intellectual figures during the first half of the 16th century. In his time he was most renowned as one of the main proponents of the Swedish reformation of 1523-31.

== Biography ==
Laurentius Andreae was born in the town of Strängnäs. As was the case with many 15th century personalities, the date of his birth remained unrecorded, although the year is generally assumed to have been in the early 1470s.

During his youth he was a priest, and had travelled to Rome as well as conducted studies abroad. In 1509, when he was in his mid- to late thirties, he received an appointment as deacon of his hometown of Strängnäs. In the intervening years he met Olaus Petri, converted to Lutheranism and by the 1520s was promoted to archdeacon of Uppsala.

Along with Olaus Petri and his brother Laurentius, Andreae completed the full translation of the Bible into Swedish, known as the "Gustav Vasa Bible" of 1541. He served as chancellor for King Gustav I Vasa and cherished by Laurentius Petri, the Archbishop, because they shared a strong Lutheran faith. In 1527, at the Diet of Västerås, he declared the King to be the head of the Church of Sweden.

In 1540, he and Olaus Petri were sentenced to death. Historians differ in regard to the nature of the alleged transgressions, and whether the sentences were justified. All agree, however, that the verdicts were highly influenced by the King's personal opinions and disagreement with the men. After much pleading, the sentences were reduced to severe fines and both men were released. Laurentius Andreae later died in Strängnäs at the approximate age of 80.

== Other sources ==
- Article Laurentius Andreae Nordisk familjebok, in Swedish
