= Jacob Heinrich Elbfas =

Baltic German painter (c. 1600–1664)

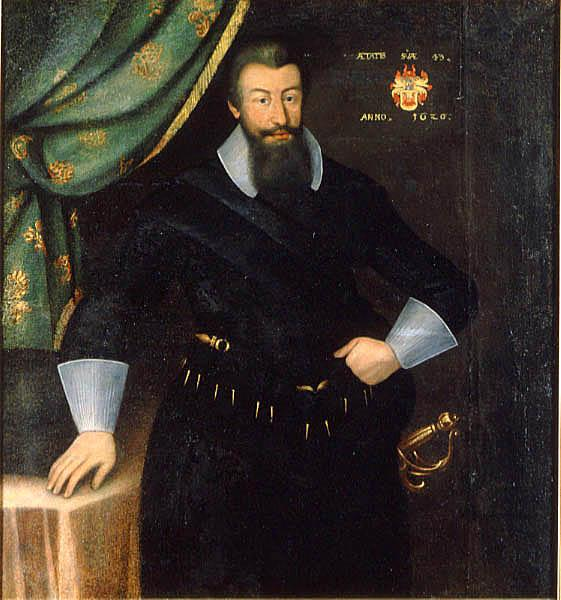
Portrait of Axel Oxenstierna, 1626

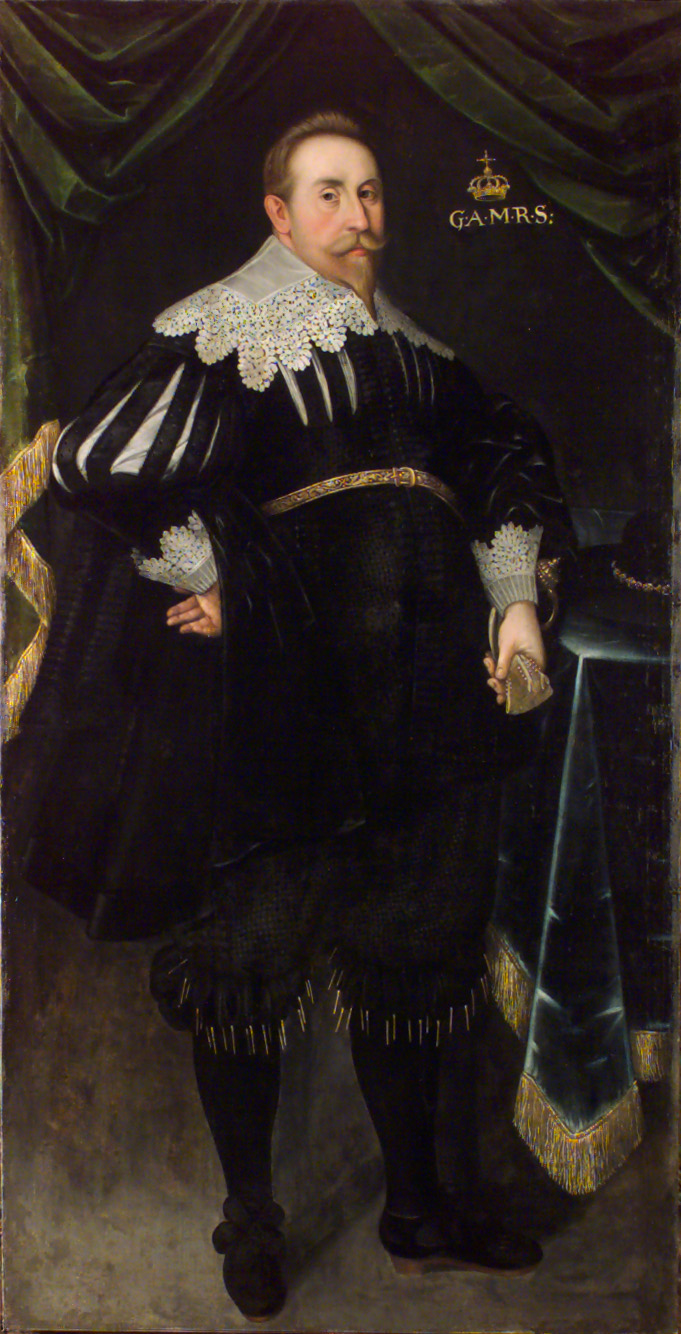
Portrait of Gustavus II Adolphus, 1630

Jacob Heinrich Elbfas (c. 1600 – 1664) was a Baltic German portrait painter, active in Sweden.

== Life ==
Elbfas was born in Livonia c. 1600 and educated in Strasbourg, in a tradition dating back to Renaissance portraits. He established himself in Sweden from 1622 and from 1628 in Stockholm where he became a guild master. From 1634 to 1640, he worked as a court painter for Queen Maria Eleonora, and was frequently employed by the Swedish nobility. His influence on Swedish art was considerable until a new generation of artists were invited by Queen Christina during the 1640s. He died in Stockholm in 1664.

== See also ==
- History of Sweden
