= Sunbeam =

Light rays appearing to radiate from the Sun

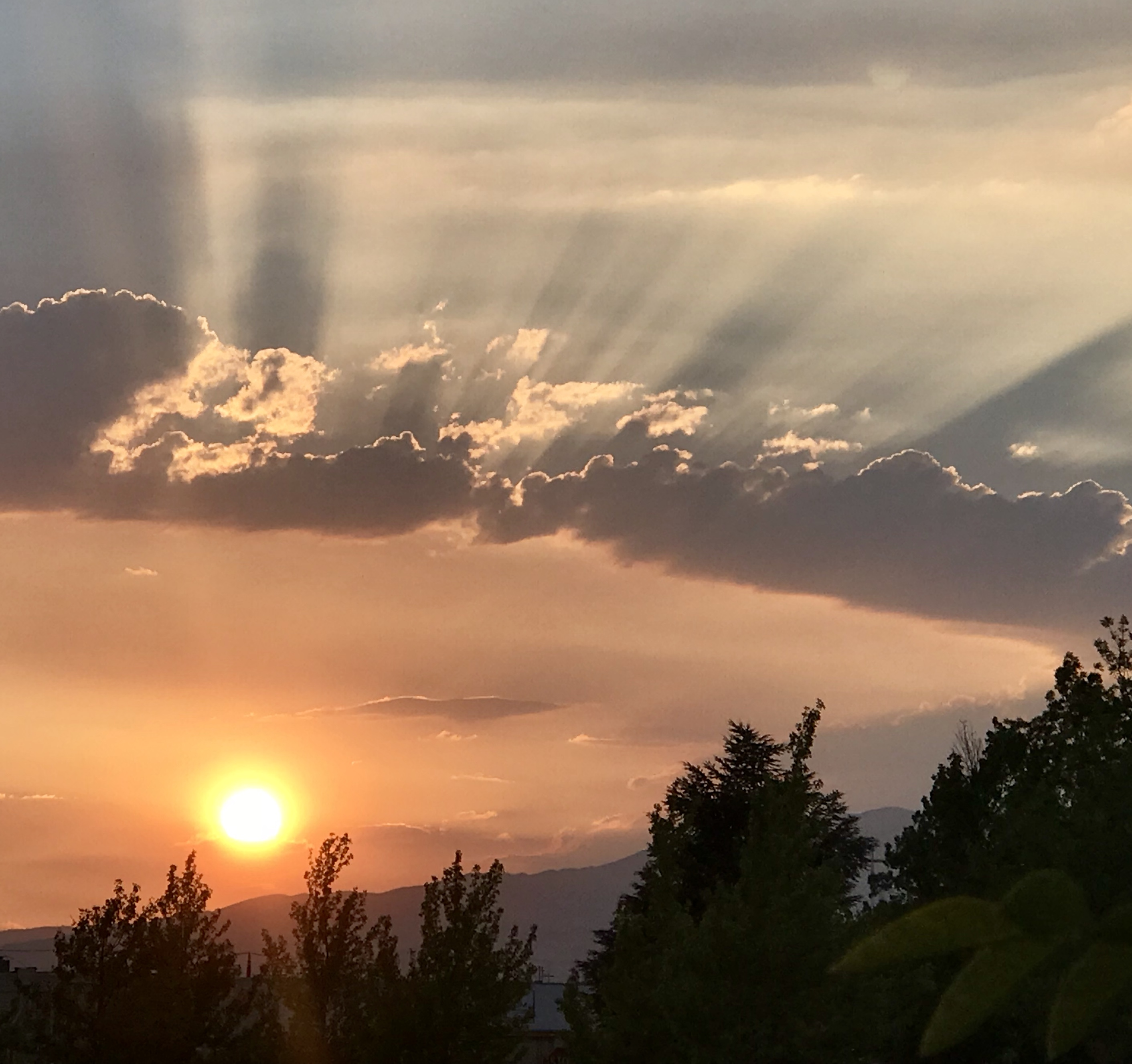
Sunbeams in Nevada during a sunset

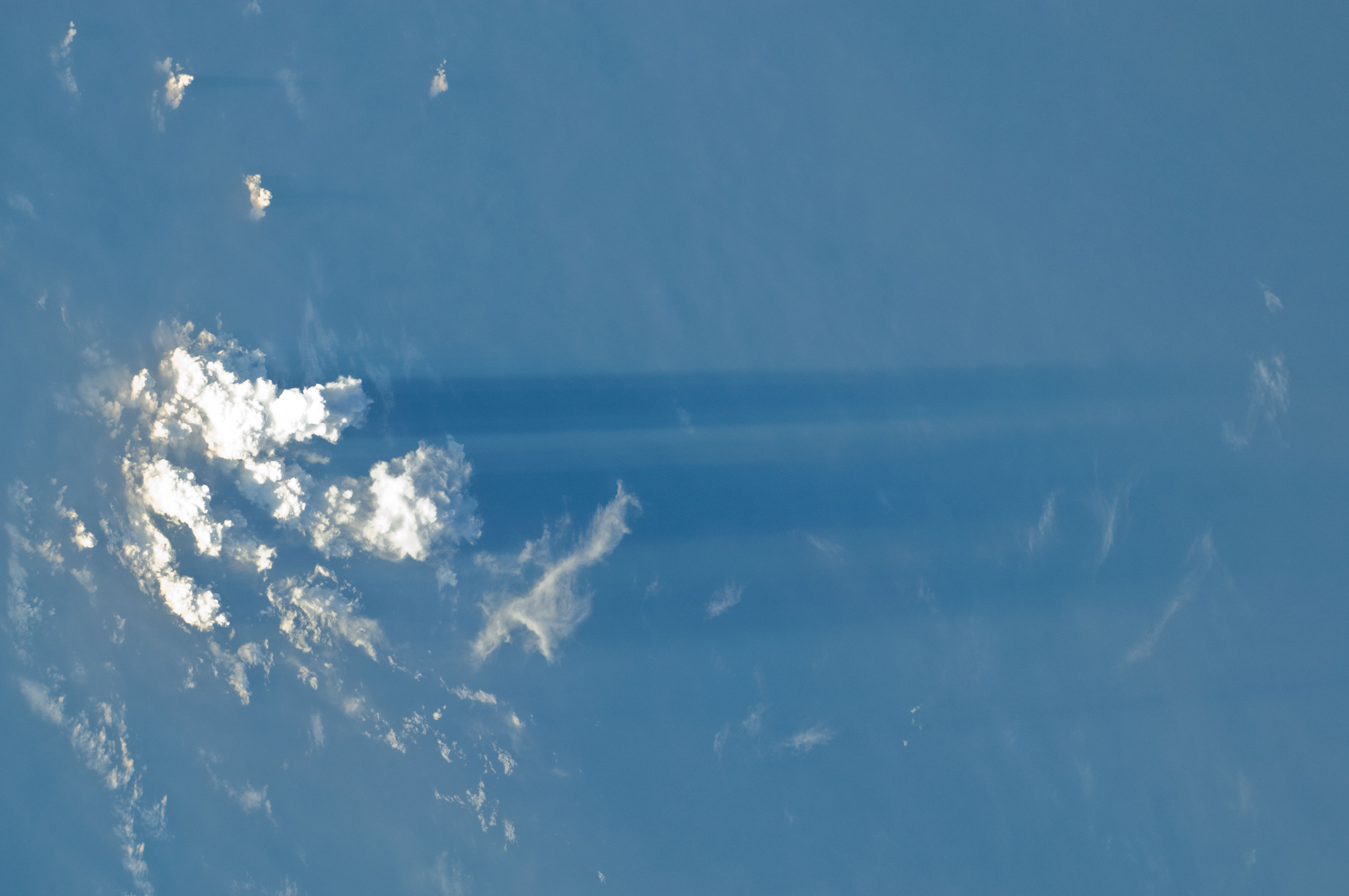
Daytime sunbeams as seen from the ISS, illustrating their parallel nature

A sunbeam, in meteorological optics, is a beam of sunlight that appears to radiate from the position of the Sun. Shining through openings in clouds or between other objects such as mountains and buildings, these beams of particle-scattered sunlight are essentially parallel shafts separated by darker shadowed volumes. Their apparent convergence in the sky is a visual illusion from linear perspective. The same illusion causes the apparent convergence of parallel lines on a long straight road or hallway at a distant vanishing point. The scattering particles that make sunlight visible may be air molecules or particulates.

== Crepuscular rays ==
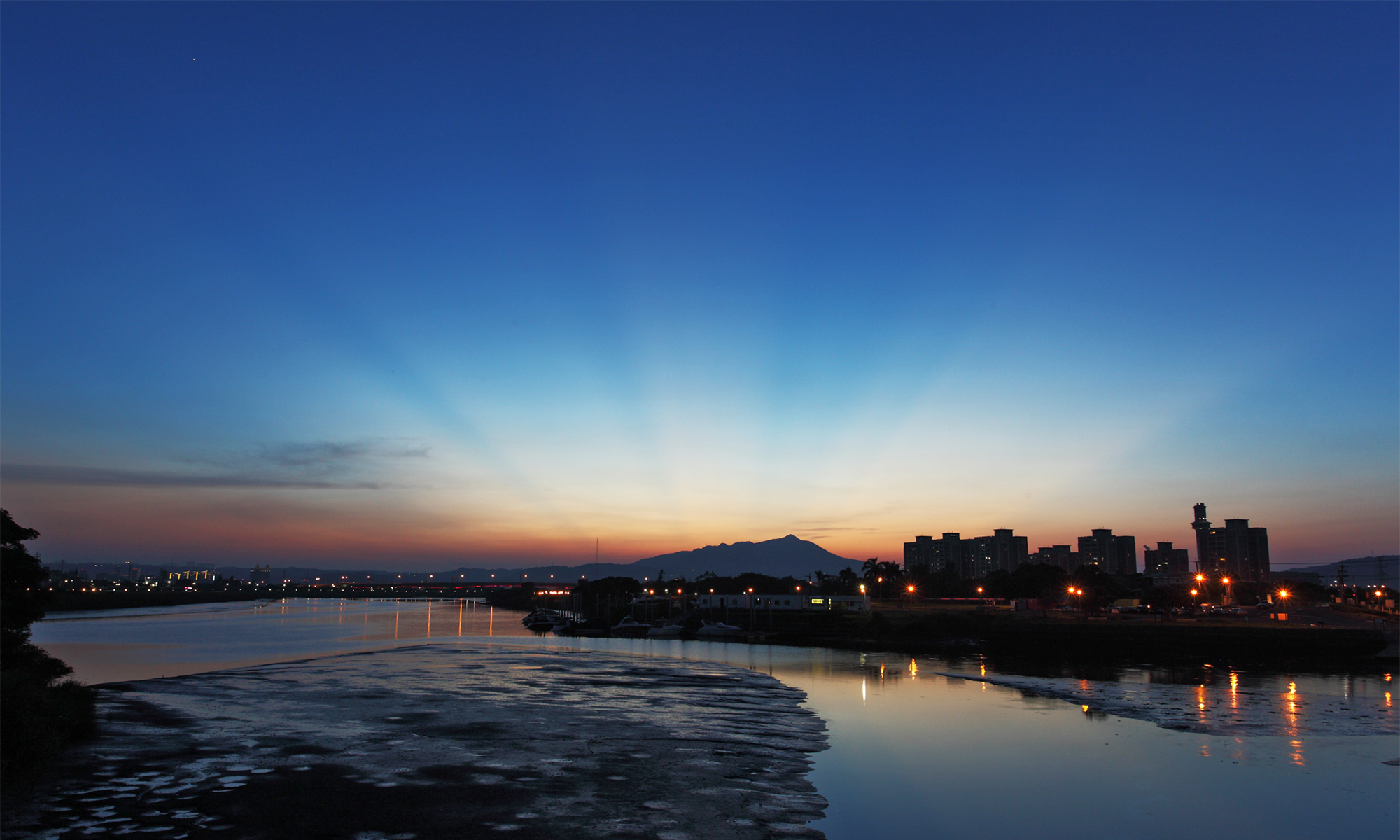
Crepuscular rays as seen from Taipei, Taiwan (2018)

Crepuscular rays or god rays are sunbeams that originate when the sun is just below the horizon, during twilight hours. Crepuscular rays are noticeable when the contrast between light and dark is most obvious. Crepuscular comes from the Latin word "crepusculum", meaning twilight. Crepuscular rays usually appear orange because the path through the atmosphere at sunrise and sunset passes through up to 40 times as much air as rays from a high midday sun. Particles in the air scatter short wavelength light (blue and green) through Rayleigh scattering much more strongly than longer wavelength yellow and red light.

Loosely, the term "crepuscular rays" is sometimes extended to the general phenomenon of rays of sunlight that appear to converge at a point in the sky, irrespective of time of day.

== Anticrepuscular rays ==
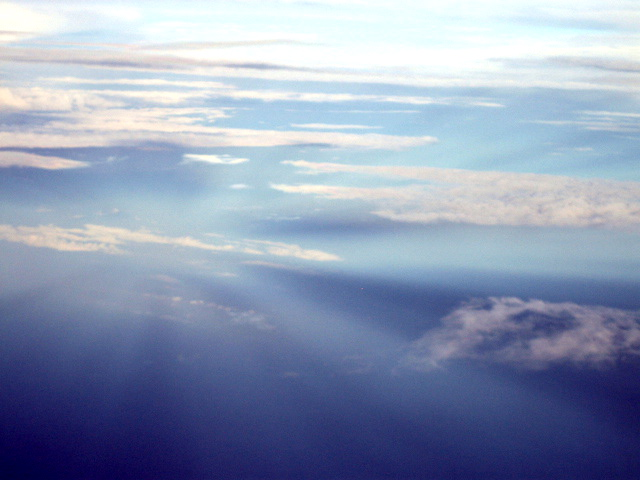
These anticrepuscular rays appear to converge at the antisolar point, as viewed from an aircraft above the clouded ocean.

In some cases, sunbeams may extend across the sky and appear to converge at the antisolar point, the point on the celestial sphere opposite of the Sun's direction. In this case, they are called antisolar rays (anytime not during astronomical night) or anticrepuscular rays (during the twilight period). This apparent dual convergence (at both the solar and the antisolar points) is a perspective effect analogous to the apparent dual convergence of the parallel lines of a long straight road or hallway at directly opposite points (to an observer above the ground).

== Alternative names ==
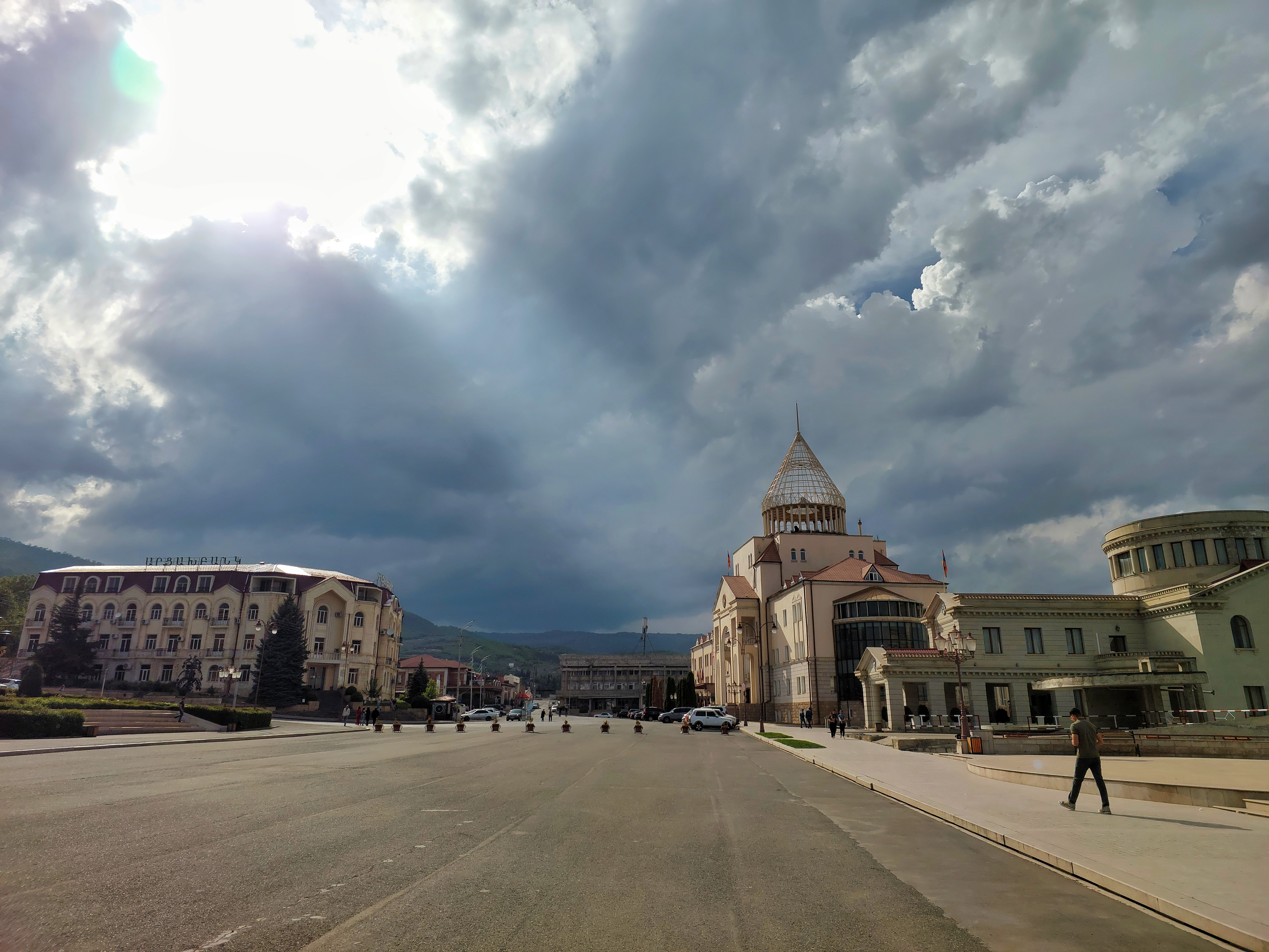
In this photo of Stepanakert, clouds create the appearance of a focused beam of sunlight shining down on the ground.

- Backstays of the sun, a nautical term, from the fact that backstays that brace the mast of a sailing ship converge in a similar way
- Buddha rays
- God rays, used by some members of the computer graphics industry
- Jacob's Ladder
- Light shafts, sometimes used in the computer graphics industry, such as the game engine Unreal Engine
- Ropes of Maui, originally taura a Maui – from the Maori tale of Maui Potiki restraining the sun with ropes to make the days longer
- Sun drawing water, from the ancient Greek belief that sunbeams drew water into the sky (an early description of evaporation)

== See also ==
- Airglow – Faint emission of light by a planetary atmosphere
- Anticrepuscular rays – Meteorological optical phenomenon
- Light beam – Projection of light energy
- Earth's shadow – Shadow that Earth casts through its atmosphere and into outer space
- Rayleigh scattering – Light scattering by small particles
- Sunlight – Light emitted by the Sun
- Tyndall effect – Scattering of light by tiny particles in a colloidal suspension
- Volumetric lighting – Effect in computer graphics
