= Atmospheric optics =

Optical characteristics of the atmosphere

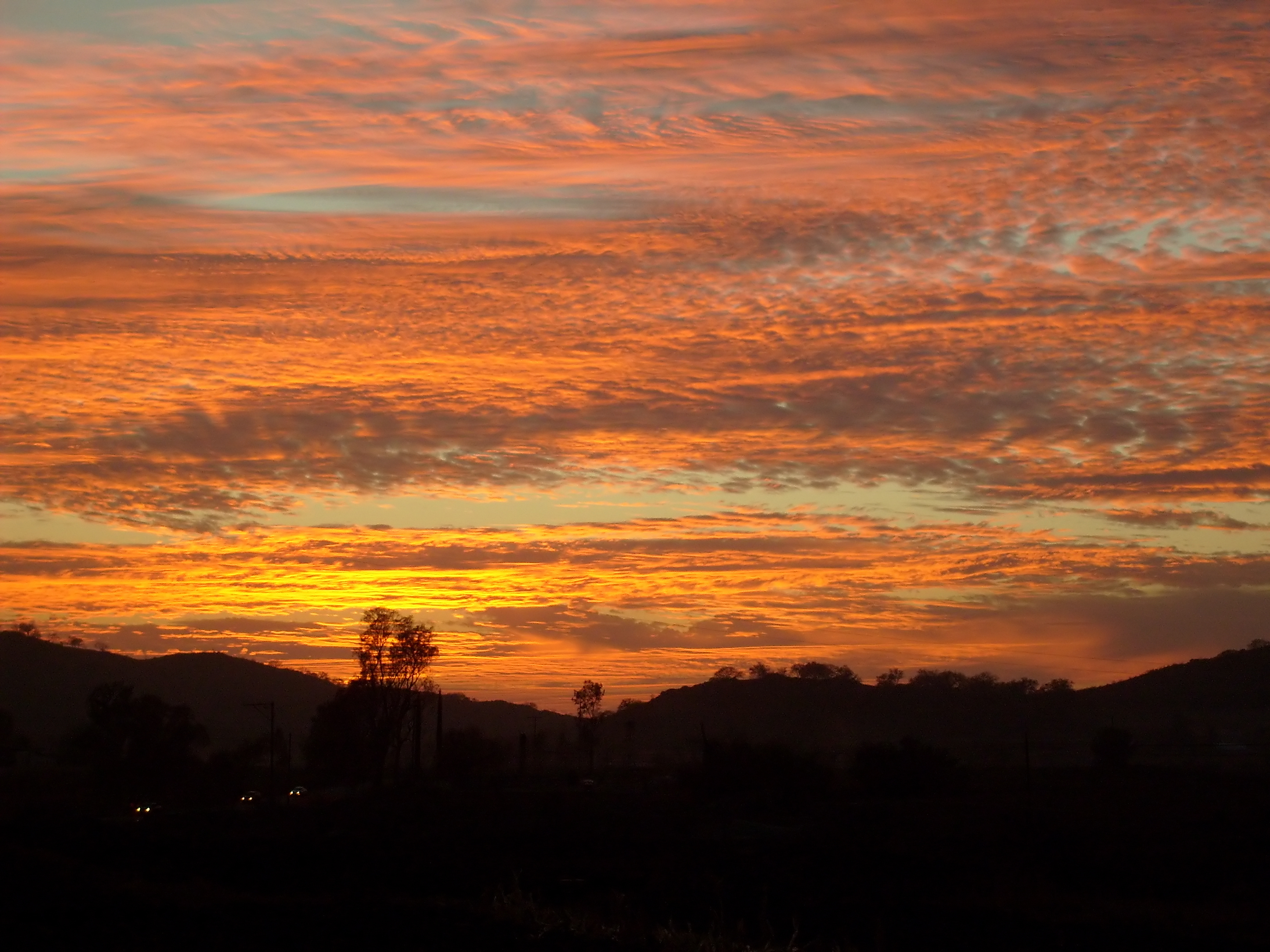
A colorful sky is often due to indirect sunlight being scattered off air molecules and particulates, like smog, soot, and cloud droplets, as shown in this photo of a sunset during the October 2007 California wildfires.

Atmospheric optics is "the study of the optical characteristics of the atmosphere or products of atmospheric processes .... [including] temporal and spatial resolutions beyond those discernible with the naked eye". Meteorological optics is "that part of atmospheric optics concerned with the study of patterns observable with the naked eye". Nevertheless, the two terms are sometimes used interchangeably.

Meteorological optical phenomena, as described in this article, are concerned with how the optical properties of Earth's atmosphere cause a wide range of optical phenomena and visual perception phenomena. Examples of meteorological phenomena include:

- The blue color of the sky. This is from Rayleigh scattering, which sends more higher frequency/shorter wavelength (blue) sunlight into the eye of an observer than other frequencies/wavelength.
- The reddish color of the Sun when it is observed through a thick atmosphere, as during a sunrise or sunset. This is because long-wavelength (red) light is scattered less than blue light. The red light reaches the observer's eye, whereas the blue light is scattered out of the line of sight.
- Other colours in the sky, such as glowing skies at dusk and dawn. These are from additional particulate matter in the sky that scatter different colors at different angles.
- Halos, afterglows, coronas, polar stratospheric clouds, and sun dogs. These are from scattering, or refraction, by ice crystals and from other particles in the atmosphere. They depend on different particle sizes and geometries.
- Mirages. These are optical phenomena in which light rays are bent due to thermal variations in the refractive index of air, producing displaced or heavily distorted images of distant objects. Other optical phenomena associated with this include the Novaya Zemlya effect, in which the Sun has a distorted shape and rises earlier or sets later than predicted. A spectacular form of refraction, called the Fata Morgana, occurs with a temperature inversion, in which objects on the horizon or even beyond the horizon (e.g. islands, cliffs, ships, and icebergs) appear elongated and elevated, like "fairy tale castles".
- Rainbows. These result from a combination of internal reflection and dispersive refraction of light in raindrops. Because rainbows are seen on the opposite side of the sky from the Sun, rainbows are more visible the closer the Sun is to the horizon. For example, if the Sun is overhead, any possible rainbow appears near an observer's feet, making it hard to see, and involves very few raindrops between the observer's eyes and the ground, making any rainbow very sparse.

Other phenomena that are remarkable because they are forms of visual illusions include:

- Crepuscular rays,
- Anticrepuscular rays, and
- The apparent size of celestial objects such as the Sun and Moon.

== History ==
A book on meteorological optics was published in the sixteenth century, but there have been numerous books on the subject since about 1950. The topic was popularised by the wide circulation of a book by Marcel Minnaert, Light and Color in the Open Air, in 1954.

== Sun and Moon size ==
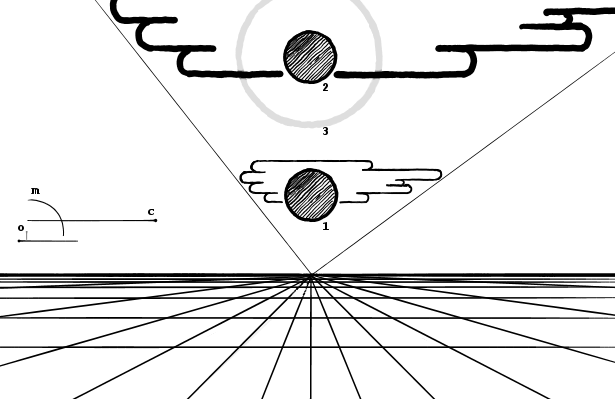
Comparison between the relative sizes of the Moon and a cloud at different points in the sky

In the Book of Optics (1011–22 AD), Ibn al-Haytham argued that vision occurs in the brain, and that personal experience has an effect on what people see and how they see, and that vision and perception are subjective. Arguing against Ptolemy's refraction theory for why people perceive the Sun and Moon larger at the horizon than when they are higher in the sky, he redefined the problem in terms of perceived, rather than real, enlargement. He said that judging the distance of an object depends on there being an uninterrupted sequence of intervening bodies between the object and the observer. Critically, Ibn al-Haytham said that judging the size of an object depends on its judged distance: an object that appears near appears smaller than an object having the same image size on the retina that appears far. With the overhead Moon, there is no uninterrupted sequence of intervening bodies. Hence it appears far and small. With a horizon Moon, there is an uninterrupted sequence of intervening bodies: all the objects between the observer and the horizon, so the Moon appears far and large. Through works by Roger Bacon, John Pecham, and Witelo based on Ibn al-Haytham's explanation, the Moon illusion gradually came to be accepted as a psychological phenomenon, with Ptolemy's theory being rejected in the 17th century. For over 100 years, research on the Moon illusion has been conducted by vision scientists who invariably have been psychologists specializing in human perception. After reviewing the many different explanations in their 2002 book The Mystery of the Moon Illusion, Ross and Plug concluded "No single theory has emerged victorious".

== Sky coloration ==
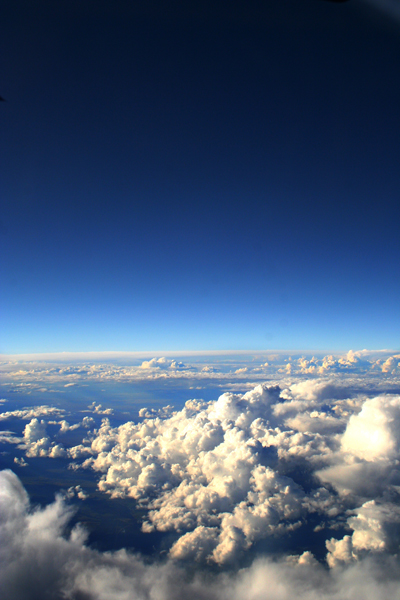
When seen from a high altitude, as here from an airplane, the sky's color varies from pale to dark at elevations toward the zenith.

The color of light from the sky is a result of Rayleigh scattering of sunlight, which results in a perceived blue color. On a sunny day, Rayleigh scattering gives the sky a blue gradient, darkest around the zenith and brightest near the horizon. Light rays coming from the zenith take the shortest-possible path (1/38) through the air mass, yielding less scattering. Light rays coming from the horizon take the longest-possible path through the air, yielding more scattering.

The blueness is at the horizon because the blue light coming from great distances is also preferentially scattered. This results in a red shift of the distant light sources that is compensated by the blue hue of the scattered light in the line of sight. In other words, the red light scatters also; if it does so at a point a great distance from the observer it has a much higher chance of reaching the observer than blue light. At distances nearing infinity, the scattered light is therefore white. Distant clouds or snowy mountaintops will seem yellow for that reason; that effect is not obvious on clear days, but very pronounced when clouds are covering the line of sight reducing the blue hue from scattered sunlight.

The scattering due to molecule sized particles (as in air) is greater in the forward and backward directions than it is in the lateral direction. Individual water droplets exposed to white light will create a set of colored rings. If a cloud is thick enough, scattering from multiple water droplets will wash out the set of colored rings and create a washed out white color. Dust from the Sahara moves around the southern periphery of the subtropical ridge moves into the southeastern United States during the summer, which changes the sky from a blue to a white appearance and leads to an increase in red sunsets. Its presence negatively affects air quality during the summer since it adds to the count of airborne particulates.

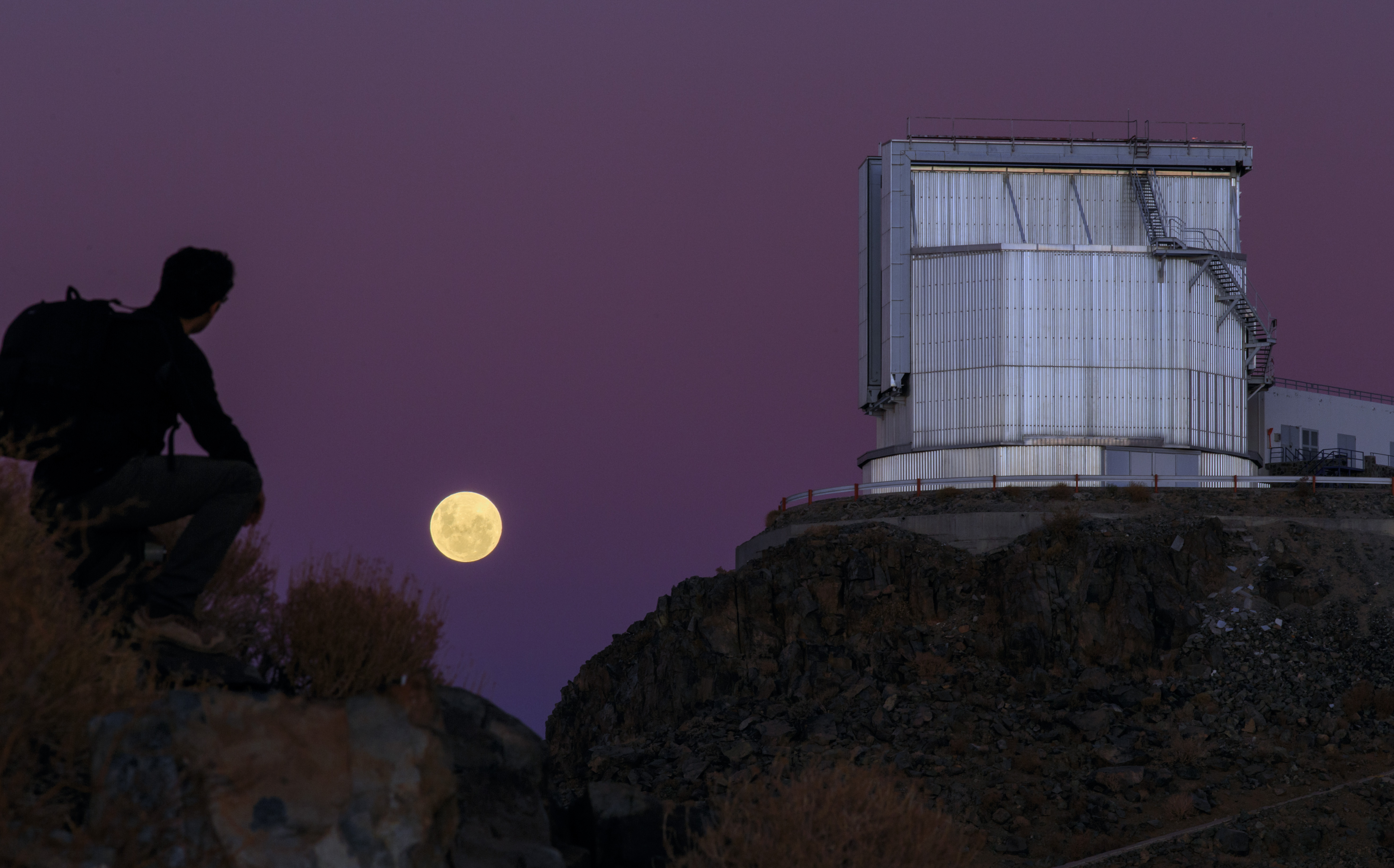
Purple sky on the La Silla Observatory.

The sky can turn a multitude of colors such as red, orange, pink and yellow (especially near sunset or sunrise) and black at night. Scattering effects also partially polarize light from the sky, most pronounced at an angle 90° from the Sun.

Sky luminance distribution models have been recommended by the International Commission on Illumination (CIE) for the design of daylighting schemes. Recent developments relate to “all sky models” for modelling sky luminance under weather conditions ranging from clear sky to overcast.

== Cloud coloration ==
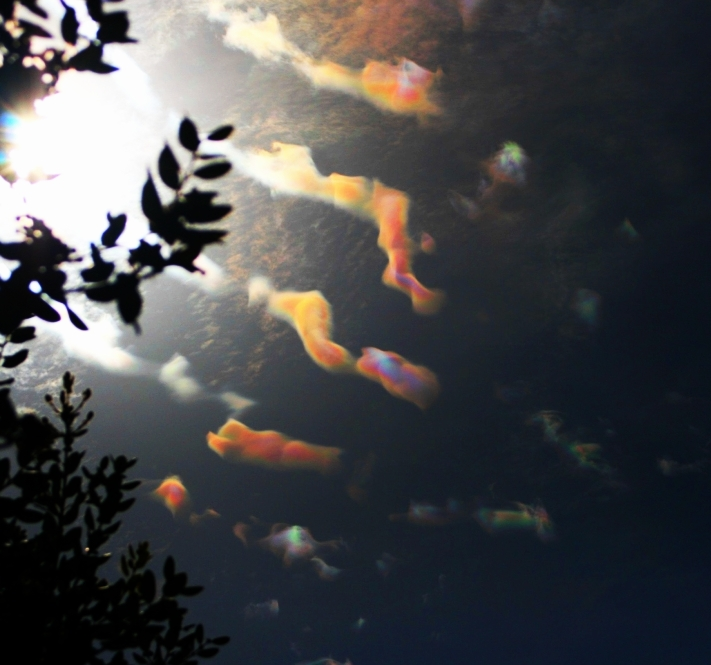
An occurrence of altocumulus and cirrocumulus cloud iridescence

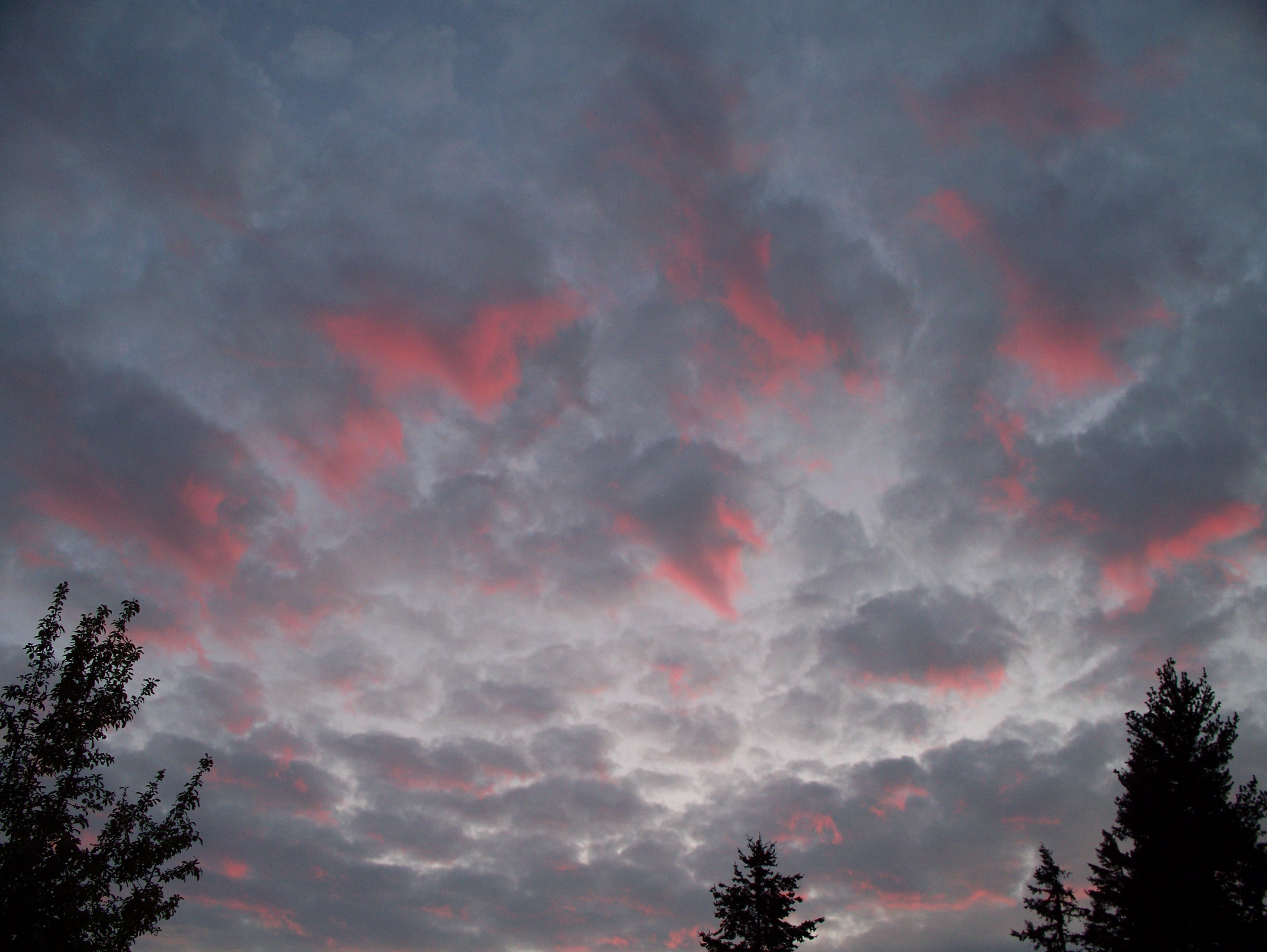
Sunset reflecting shades of pink onto grey stratocumulus clouds.

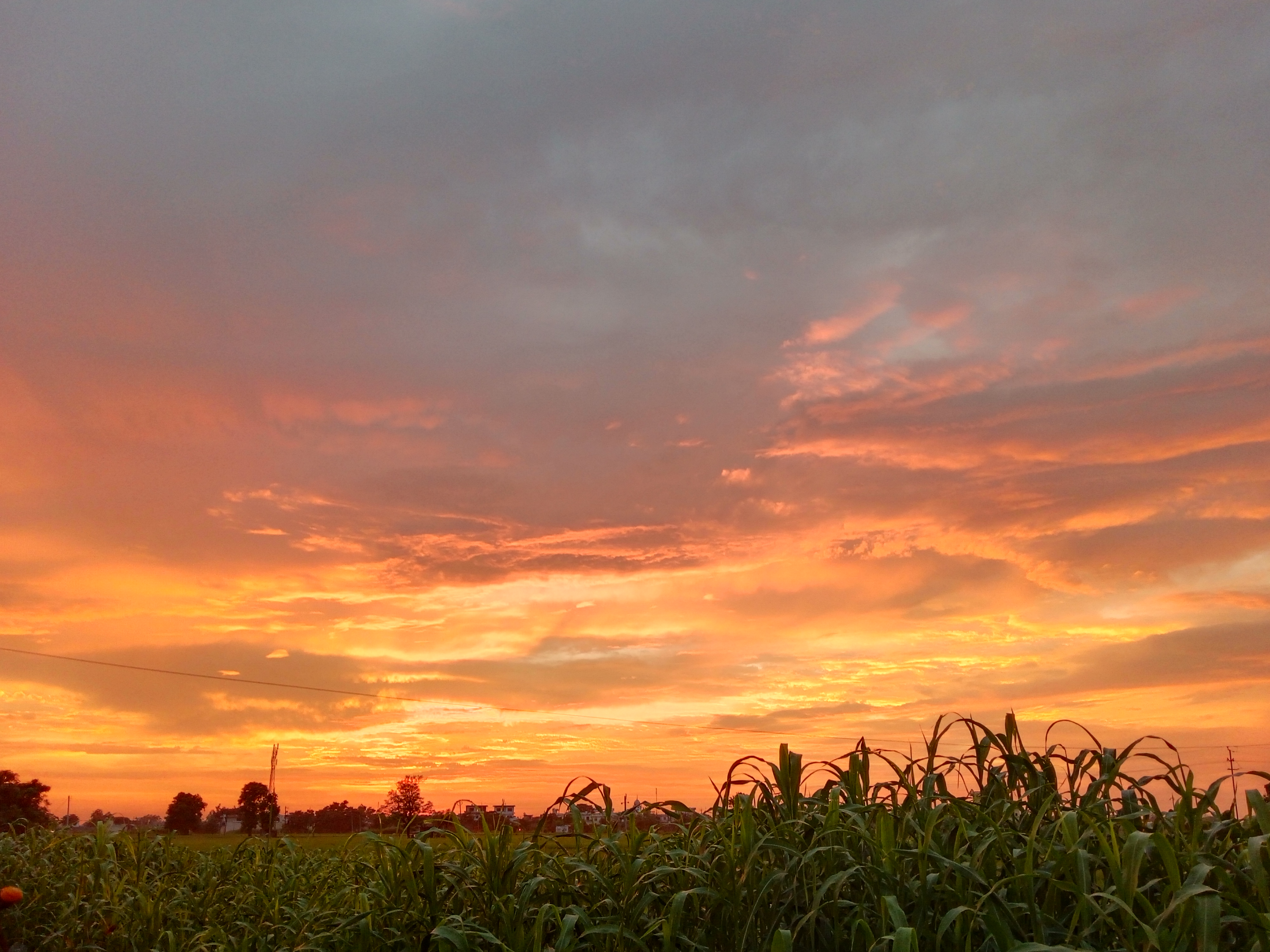
Golden sunset illumination of the cloud undersides

The color of a cloud, as seen from the Earth, tells much about what is going on inside the cloud. Dense deep tropospheric clouds exhibit a high reflectance (70% to 95%) throughout the visible spectrum. Tiny particles of water are densely packed and sunlight cannot penetrate far into the cloud before it is reflected out, giving a cloud its characteristic white color, especially when viewed from the top. Cloud droplets tend to scatter light efficiently, so that the intensity of the solar radiation decreases with depth into the gases. As a result, the cloud base can vary from a very light to very dark grey depending on the cloud's thickness and how much light is being reflected or transmitted back to the observer. Thin clouds may look white or appear to have acquired the color of their environment or background. High tropospheric and non-tropospheric clouds appear mostly white if composed entirely of ice crystals and/or supercooled water droplets.

As a tropospheric cloud matures, the dense water droplets may combine to produce larger droplets, which may combine to form droplets large enough to fall as rain. By this process of accumulation, the space between droplets becomes increasingly larger, permitting light to penetrate farther into the cloud. If the cloud is sufficiently large and the droplets within are spaced far enough apart, it may be that a percentage of the light which enters the cloud is not reflected back out before it is absorbed. A simple example of this is being able to see farther in heavy rain than in heavy fog. This process of reflection/absorption is what causes the range of cloud color from white to black.

Other colors occur naturally in clouds. Bluish-grey is the result of light scattering within the cloud. In the visible spectrum, blue and green are at the short end of light's visible wavelengths, while red and yellow are at the long end. The short rays are more easily scattered by water droplets, and the long rays are more likely to be absorbed. The bluish color is evidence that such scattering is being produced by rain-sized droplets in the cloud. A cumulonimbus cloud emitting green is a sign that it is a severe thunderstorm, capable of heavy rain, hail, strong winds and possible tornadoes. The exact cause of green thunderstorms is still unknown, but it could be due to the combination of reddened sunlight passing through very optically thick clouds. Yellowish clouds may occur in the late spring through early fall months during forest fire season. The yellow color is due to the presence of pollutants in the smoke. Yellowish clouds caused by the presence of nitrogen dioxide are sometimes seen in urban areas with high air pollution levels.

Red, orange and pink clouds occur almost entirely at sunrise and sunset and are the result of the scattering of sunlight by the atmosphere. When the angle between the Sun and the horizon is less than 10 percent, as it is just after sunrise or just prior to sunset, sunlight becomes too red due to refraction for any colors other than those with a reddish hue to be seen. The clouds do not become that color; they are reflecting long and unscattered rays of sunlight, which are predominant at those hours. The effect is much like if a person were to shine a red spotlight on a white sheet. In combination with large, mature thunderheads this can produce blood-red clouds. Clouds look darker in the near-infrared because water absorbs solar radiation at those wavelengths.

== Halo ==
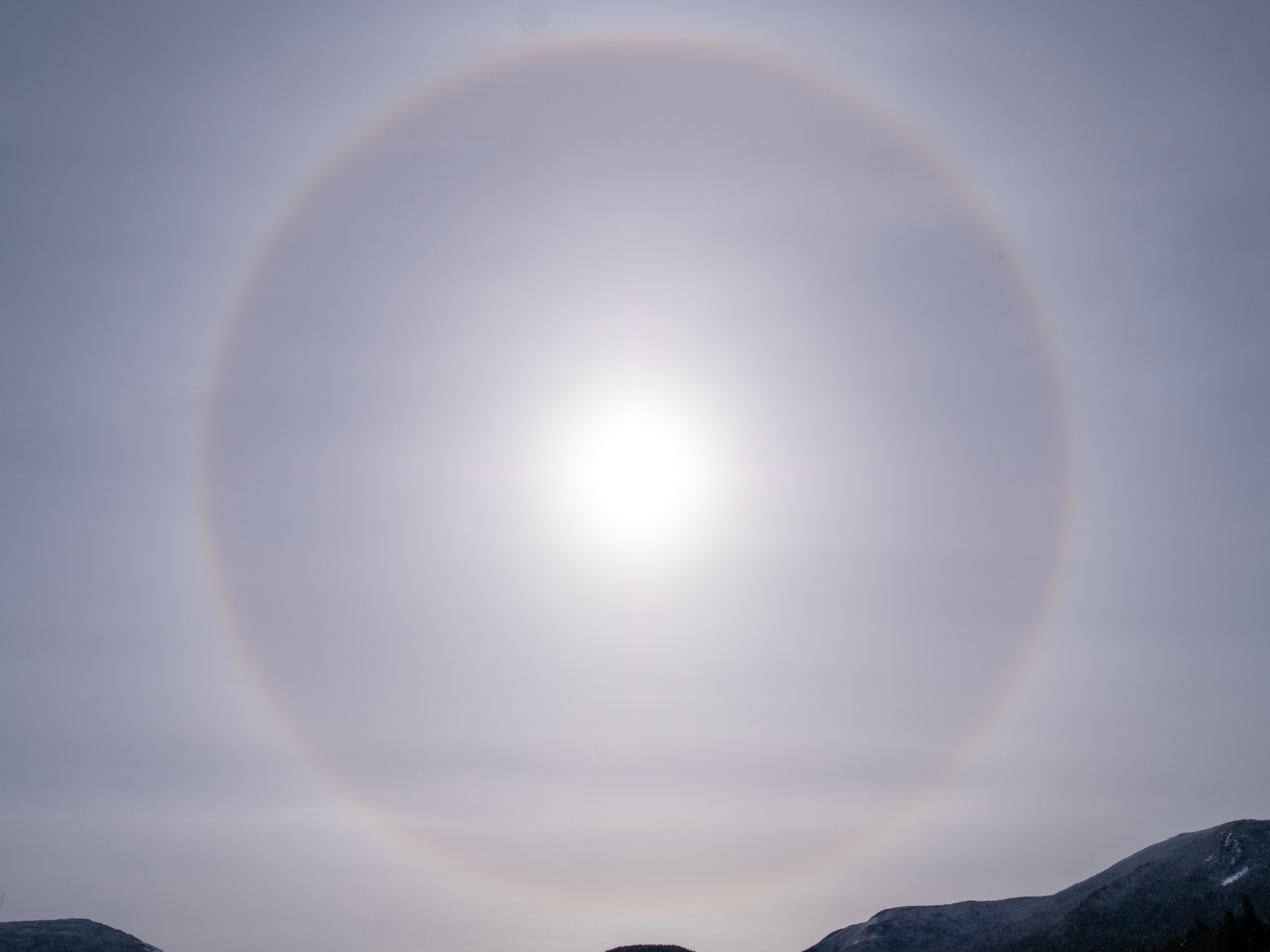
A 22° halo around the Sun, observed over Bretton Woods, New Hampshire, USA on February 13, 2021

A halo (ἅλως; also known as a nimbus, icebow or gloriole) is an optical phenomenon produced by the interaction of light from the Sun or Moon with ice crystals in the atmosphere, resulting in colored or white arcs, rings or spots in the sky. Many halos are positioned near the Sun or Moon, but others are elsewhere and even in the opposite part of the sky. They can also form around artificial lights in very cold weather when ice crystals called diamond dust are floating in the nearby air.

There are many types of ice halos. They are produced by the ice crystals in cirrus or cirrostratus clouds high in the upper troposphere, at an altitude of 5 kilometres (3.1 mi) to 10 kilometres (6.2 mi), or, during very cold weather, by ice crystals called diamond dust drifting in the air at low levels. The particular shape and orientation of the crystals are responsible for the types of halo observed. Light is reflected and refracted by the ice crystals and may split into colors because of dispersion. The crystals behave like prisms and mirrors, refracting and reflecting sunlight between their faces, sending shafts of light in particular directions. For circular halos, the preferred angular distance are 22 and 46 degrees from the ice crystals which create them. Atmospheric phenomena such as halos have been used as part of weather lore as an empirical means of weather forecasting, with their presence indicating an approach of a warm front and its associated rain.

=== Sun dogs ===
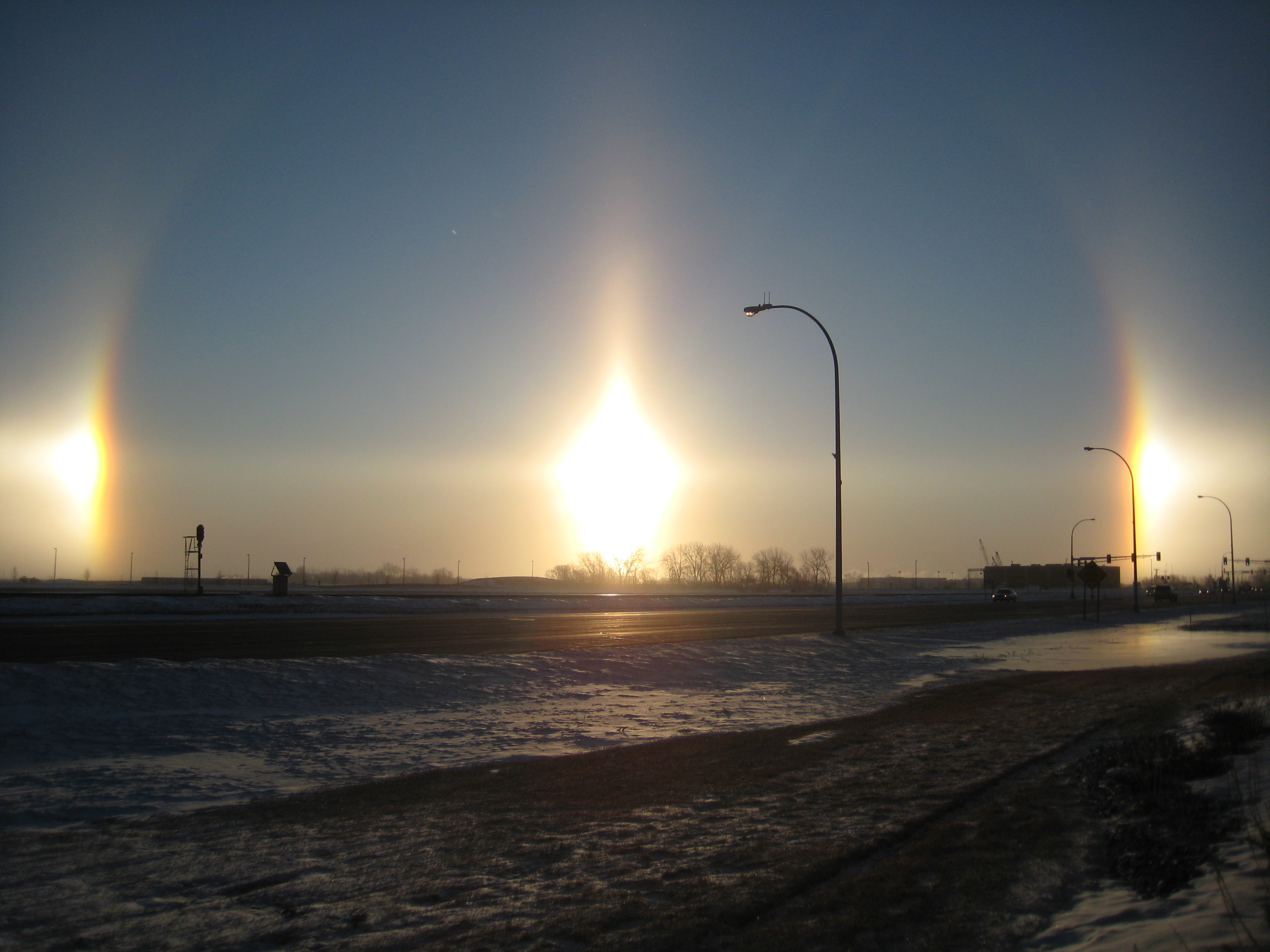
Very bright sundogs in Fargo, North Dakota. Note the halo arcs passing through each sun dog.

Sun dogs are a common type of halo, with the appearance of two subtly-colored bright spots to the left and right of the Sun, at a distance of about 22° and at the same elevation above the horizon. They are commonly caused by plate-shaped hexagonal ice crystals. These crystals tend to become horizontally aligned as they sink through the air, causing them to refract the sunlight to the left and right, resulting in the two sun dogs.

As the Sun rises higher, the rays passing through the crystals are increasingly skewed from the horizontal plane. Their angle of deviation increases and the sundogs move further from the Sun. However, they always stay at the same elevation as the Sun. Sun dogs are red-colored at the side nearest the Sun. Farther out the colors grade to blue or violet. However, the colors overlap considerably and so are muted, rarely pure or saturated. The colors of the sun dog finally merge into the white of the parhelic circle (if the latter is visible).

It is theoretically possible to predict the forms of sun dogs as would be seen on other planets and moons. Mars might have sundogs formed by both water-ice and CO_{2}-ice. On the giant gas planets — Jupiter, Saturn, Uranus and Neptune — other crystals form the clouds of ammonia, methane, and other substances that can produce halos with four or more sundogs.

== Glory ==
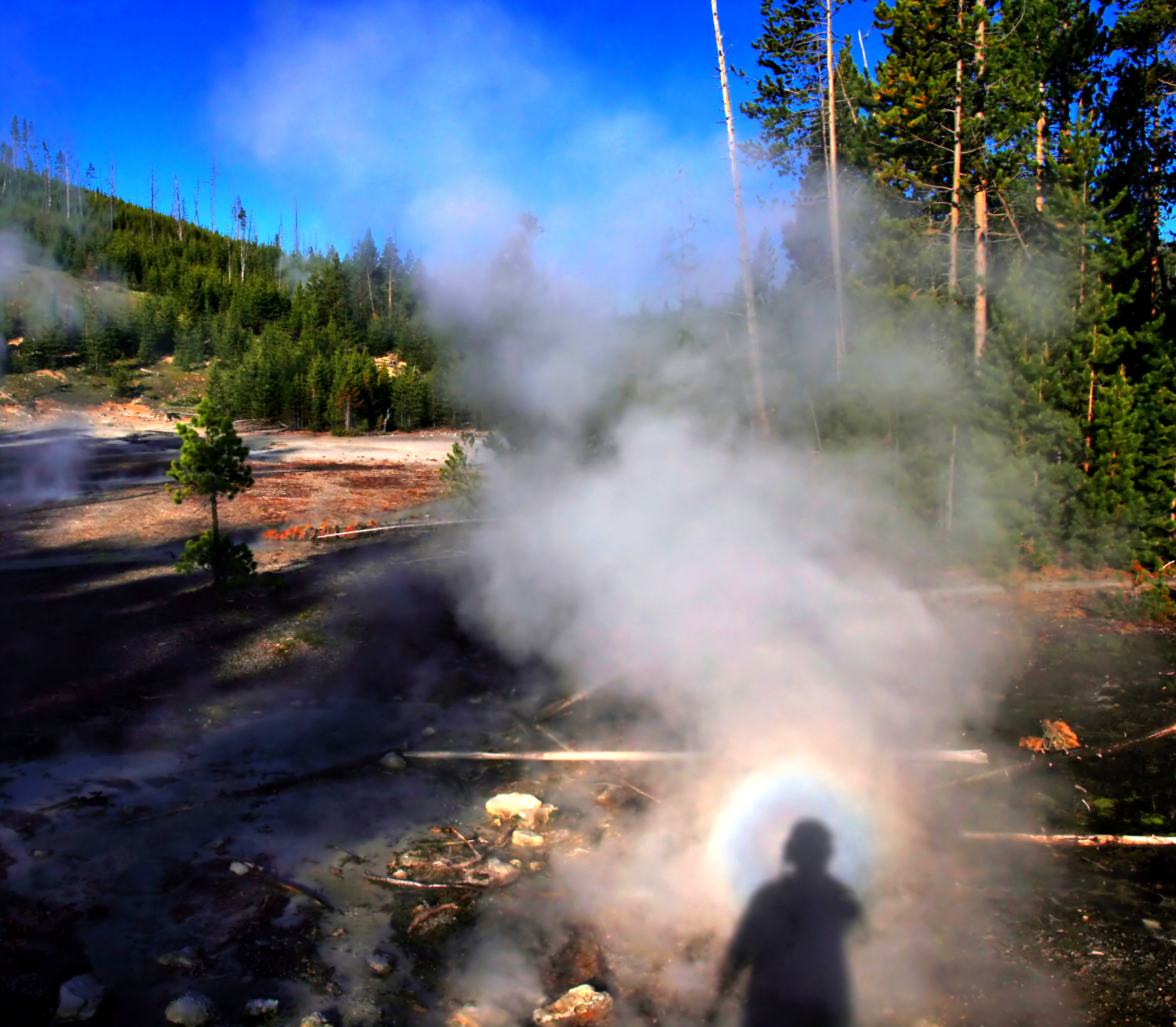
Solar glory at the steam from a hot spring

A common optical phenomenon involving water droplets is the glory. A glory is an optical phenomenon, appearing much like an iconic Saint's halo about the head of the observer, produced by light backscattered (a combination of diffraction, reflection and refraction) towards its source by a cloud of uniformly sized water droplets. A glory has multiple colored rings, with red colors on the outermost ring and blue/violet colors on the innermost ring.

The angular distance is much smaller than a rainbow, ranging between 5° and 20°, depending on the size of the droplets. The glory can only be seen when the observer is directly between the Sun and cloud of refracting water droplets. Hence, it is commonly observed while airborne, with the glory surrounding the airplane's shadow on clouds (this is often called The Glory of the Pilot). Glories can also be seen from mountains and tall buildings, when there are clouds or fog below the level of the observer, or on days with ground fog. The glory is related to the optical phenomenon anthelion.

== Rainbow ==
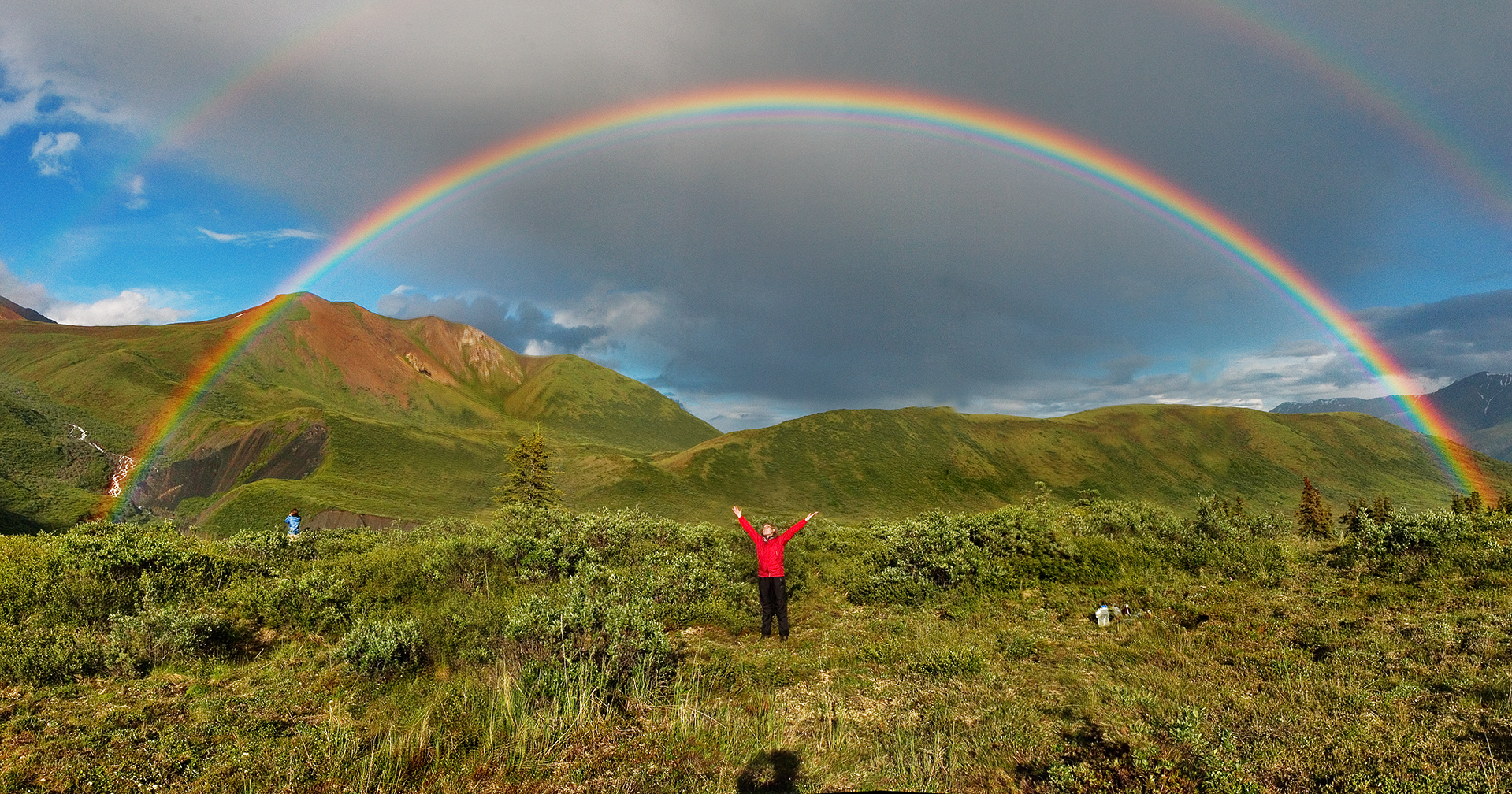
Double rainbow and supernumerary rainbows on the inside of the primary arc. The shadow of the photographer's head marks the centre of the rainbow circle (antisolar point).

A rainbow is a narrow, multicoloured semicircular arc due to dispersion of white light by a multitude of drops of water, usually in the form of rain, when they are illuminated by sunlight. Hence, when conditions are right, a rainbow always appears in the section of sky directly opposite the Sun. For an observer on the ground, the amount of the arc that is visible depends on the height of the sun above the horizon. It is a full semicircle with an angular radius of 42° when the sun is at the horizon. But as the sun rises in the sky, the arc grows smaller and ceases to be visible when the sun is more than 42° above the horizon. To see more than a semicircular bow, an observer would have to be able to look down on the drops, say from an airplane or a mountaintop. Rainbows are most common during afternoon rain showers in summer.

A single reflection off the backs of an array of raindrops produces a rainbow with an angular size that ranges from 40° to 42° with red on the outside and blue/violet on the inside. This is known as the primary bow. A fainter secondary bow is often visible some 10° outside the primary bow. It is due to two internal reflections within a drop. The resulting secondary arc is some 3° wide and the colours are reversed, with blue/violet on the outside. Two internal reflections produce a bow with angular size of 50.5° to 54° with blue/violet on the outside. The region between a double rainbow is often noticeably darker that the sky within the primary bow and that beyond the secondary bow. It known an Alexander's Dark Band. The reason for this apparent reduction in sky brightness is that, while light from the sky enclosed within the primary bow comes from droplet reflection, and light beyond the secondary bow also comes from droplet reflection, there is no mechanism for the region between the bows to reflect light in the direction of the observer. Generally speaking, larger the droplets make for brighter bows.

A rainbow spans a continuous spectrum of colors; the distinct bands (including the number of bands) are an artifact of human color vision, and no banding of any type is seen in a black-and-white photograph of a rainbow (only a smooth gradation of intensity to a maxima, then fading to a minima at the other side of the arc). For colors seen by a normal human eye, the most commonly cited and remembered sequence, in English, is Isaac Newton's sevenfold red, orange, yellow, green, blue, indigo and violet (popularly memorized by mnemonics like Roy G. Biv).

== Mirage ==
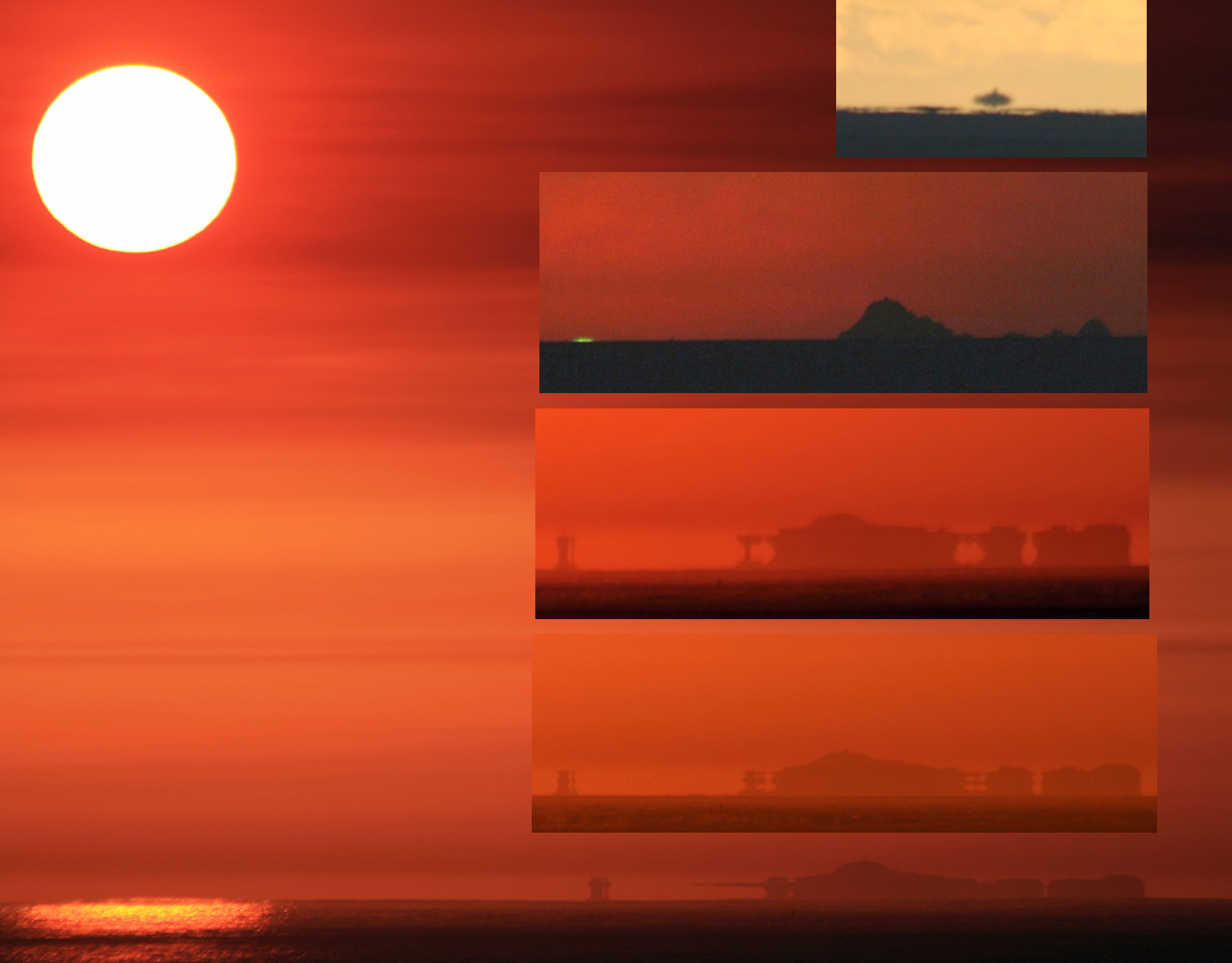
Various kinds of mirages in one location taken over the course of six minutes. The uppermost inset frame shows an inferior mirage of the Farallon Islands. The second inset frame shows a green flash on the left-hand side. The two lower frames and the main frame all show superior mirages of the Farallon Islands. In these three frames, the superior mirage evolves from a 3-image mirage to a 5-image mirage, and back to a 2-image mirage. Such a display is consistent with a Fata Morgana.

A mirage is a naturally occurring optical phenomenon in which light rays are bent to produce a displaced image of distant objects or the sky. The word comes to English via the French mirage, from the Latin mirare, meaning "to look at, to wonder at". This is the same root as for "mirror" and "to admire". Also, it has its roots in the Arabic mirage.

In contrast to a hallucination, a mirage is a real optical phenomenon which can be captured on camera, since light rays actually are refracted to form the false image at the observer's location. What the image appears to represent, however, is determined by the interpretive faculties of the human mind. For example, inferior images on land are very easily mistaken for the reflections from a small body of water.

Mirages can be categorized as "inferior" (meaning lower), "superior" (meaning higher) and "Fata Morgana", one kind of superior mirage consisting of a series of unusually elaborate, vertically stacked images, which form one rapidly changing mirage.

Green flashes and green rays are optical phenomena that occur shortly after sunset or before sunrise, when a green spot is visible, usually for no more than a second or two, above the Sun, or a green ray shoots up from the sunset point. Green flashes are actually a group of phenomena stemming from different causes, and some are more common than others. Green flashes can be observed from any altitude (even from an aircraft). They are usually seen at an unobstructed horizon, such as over the ocean, but are possible over cloud tops and mountain tops as well.

A green flash from the Moon and bright planets at the horizon, including Venus and Jupiter, can also be observed.

=== Fata Morgana ===
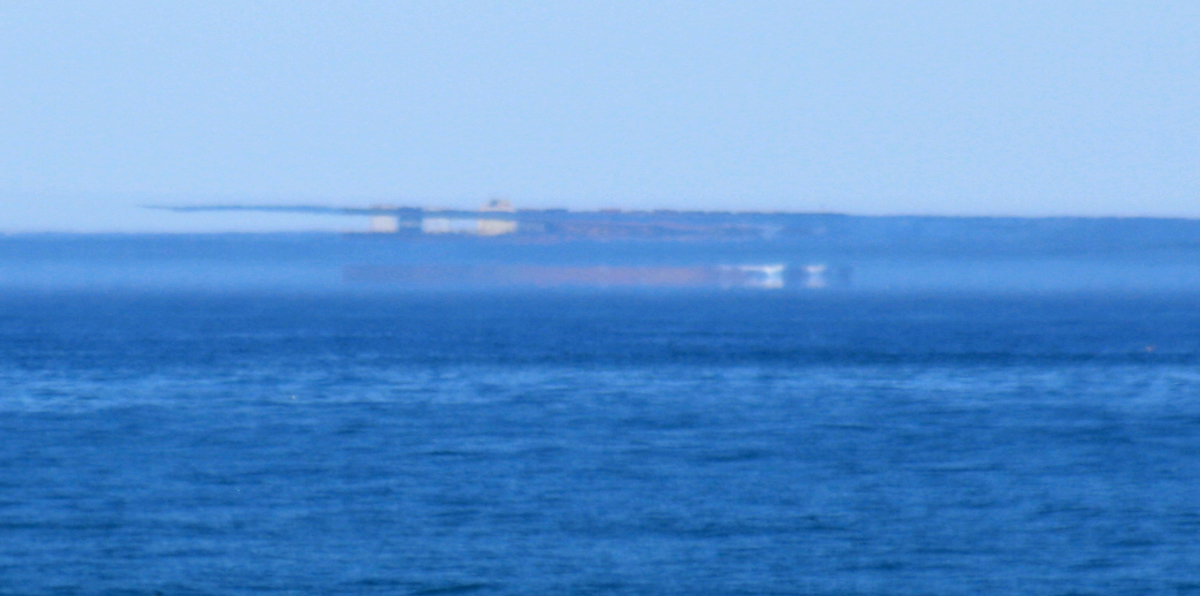
A Fata Morgana of a boat

This optical phenomenon occurs because rays of light are strongly bent when they pass through air layers of different temperatures in a steep thermal inversion where an atmospheric duct has formed. A thermal inversion is an atmospheric condition where warmer air exists in a well-defined layer above a layer of significantly cooler air. This temperature inversion is the opposite of what is normally the case; air is usually warmer close to the surface, and cooler higher up. In calm weather, a layer of significantly warmer air can rest over colder dense air, forming an atmospheric duct which acts like a refracting lens, producing a series of both inverted and erect images.

A Fata Morgana is an unusual and very complex form of mirage, a form of superior mirage, which, like many other kinds of superior mirages, is seen in a narrow band right above the horizon. It is an Italian phrase derived from the vulgar Latin for "fairy" and the Arthurian sorcerer Morgan le Fay, from a belief that the mirage, often seen in the Strait of Messina, were fairy castles in the air, or false land designed to lure sailors to their death created by her witchcraft. Although the term Fata Morgana is sometimes incorrectly applied to other, more common kinds of mirages, the true Fata Morgana is not the same as an ordinary superior mirage, and is certainly not the same as an inferior mirage.

Fata Morgana mirages tremendously distort the object or objects which they are based on, such that the object often appears to be very unusual, and may even be transformed in such a way that it is completely unrecognizable. A Fata Morgana can be seen on land or at sea, in polar regions or in deserts. This kind of mirage can involve almost any kind of distant object, including such things as boats, islands, and coastline.

A Fata Morgana is not only complex, but also rapidly changing. The mirage comprises several inverted (upside down) and erect (right side up) images that are stacked on top of one another. Fata Morgana mirages also show alternating compressed and stretched zones.

=== Novaya Zemlya effect ===
The Novaya Zemlya effect is a polar mirage caused by high refraction of sunlight between atmospheric thermoclines. The Novaya Zemlya effect will give the impression that the sun is rising earlier or setting later than it actually should (astronomically speaking). Depending on the meteorological situation the effect will present the Sun as a line or a square (which is sometimes referred to as the "rectangular sun"), made up of flattened hourglass shapes. The mirage requires rays of sunlight to have an inversion layer for hundreds of kilometres, and depends on the inversion layer's temperature gradient. The sunlight must bend to the Earth's curvature at least 400 kilometres (250 mi) to allow an elevation rise of 5 degrees for sight of the sun disk.

The first person to record the phenomenon was Gerrit de Veer, a member of Willem Barentsz' ill-fated third expedition into the polar region. Novaya Zemlya, the archipelago where de Veer first observed the phenomenon, lends its name to the effect.

== Crepuscular rays ==
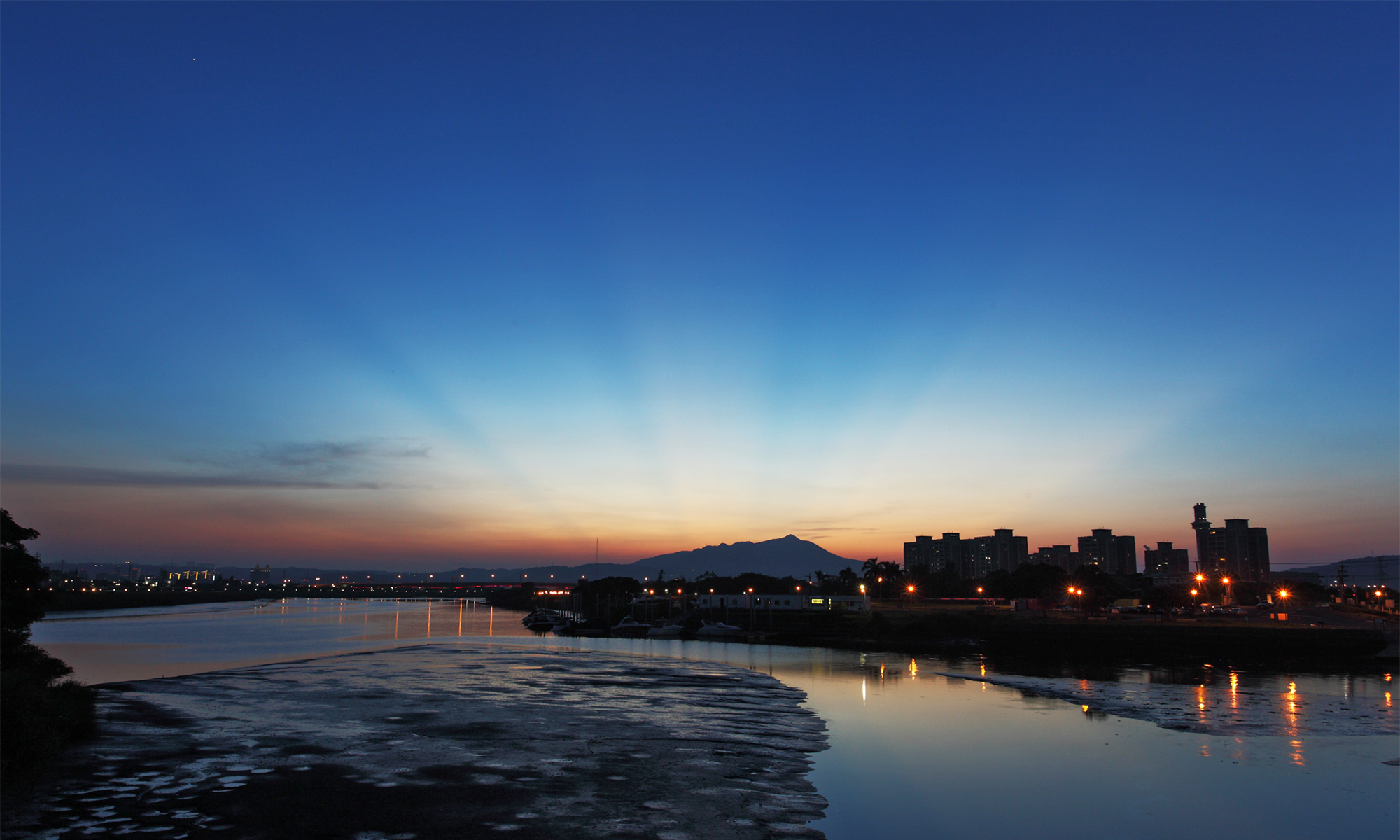
Crepuscular rays, taken in Taipei, Taiwan

Crepuscular rays are near-parallel rays of sunlight moving through the Earth's atmosphere, but appear to diverge because of linear perspective. They often occur when objects such as mountain peaks or clouds partially shadow the Sun's rays like a cloud cover. Various airborne compounds scatter the sunlight and make these rays visible, due to diffraction, reflection, and scattering.

Crepuscular rays can also occasionally be viewed underwater, particularly in arctic areas, appearing from ice shelves or cracks in the ice. Also they are also viewed in days when the sun hits the clouds in a perfect angle shining upon the area.

There are three primary forms of crepuscular rays:

- Rays of light penetrating holes in low clouds (also called "Jacob's Ladder").
- Beams of light diverging from behind a cloud.
- Pale, pinkish or reddish rays that radiate from below the horizon. These are often mistaken for light pillars.

They are commonly seen near sunrise and sunset, when tall clouds such as cumulonimbus and mountains can be most effective at creating these rays.

=== Anticrepuscular rays ===
Anticrepuscular rays while parallel in reality are sometimes visible in the sky in the direction opposite the sun. They appear to converge again at the distant horizon.

== Atmospheric refraction ==
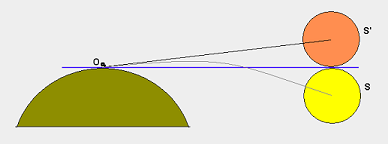
Diagram showing displacement of the Sun's image at sunrise and sunset

Atmospheric refraction influences the apparent position of astronomical and terrestrial objects, usually causing them to appear higher than they actually are. For this reason navigators, astronomers, and surveyors observe positions when these effects are minimal. Sailors will only shoot a star when 20° or more above the horizon, astronomers try to schedule observations when an object is highest in the sky, and surveyors try to observe in the afternoon when refraction is minimum.

== Atmospheric diffraction ==
Atmospheric diffraction is a visual effect caused when sunlight is bent by particles suspended in the air.

== List ==
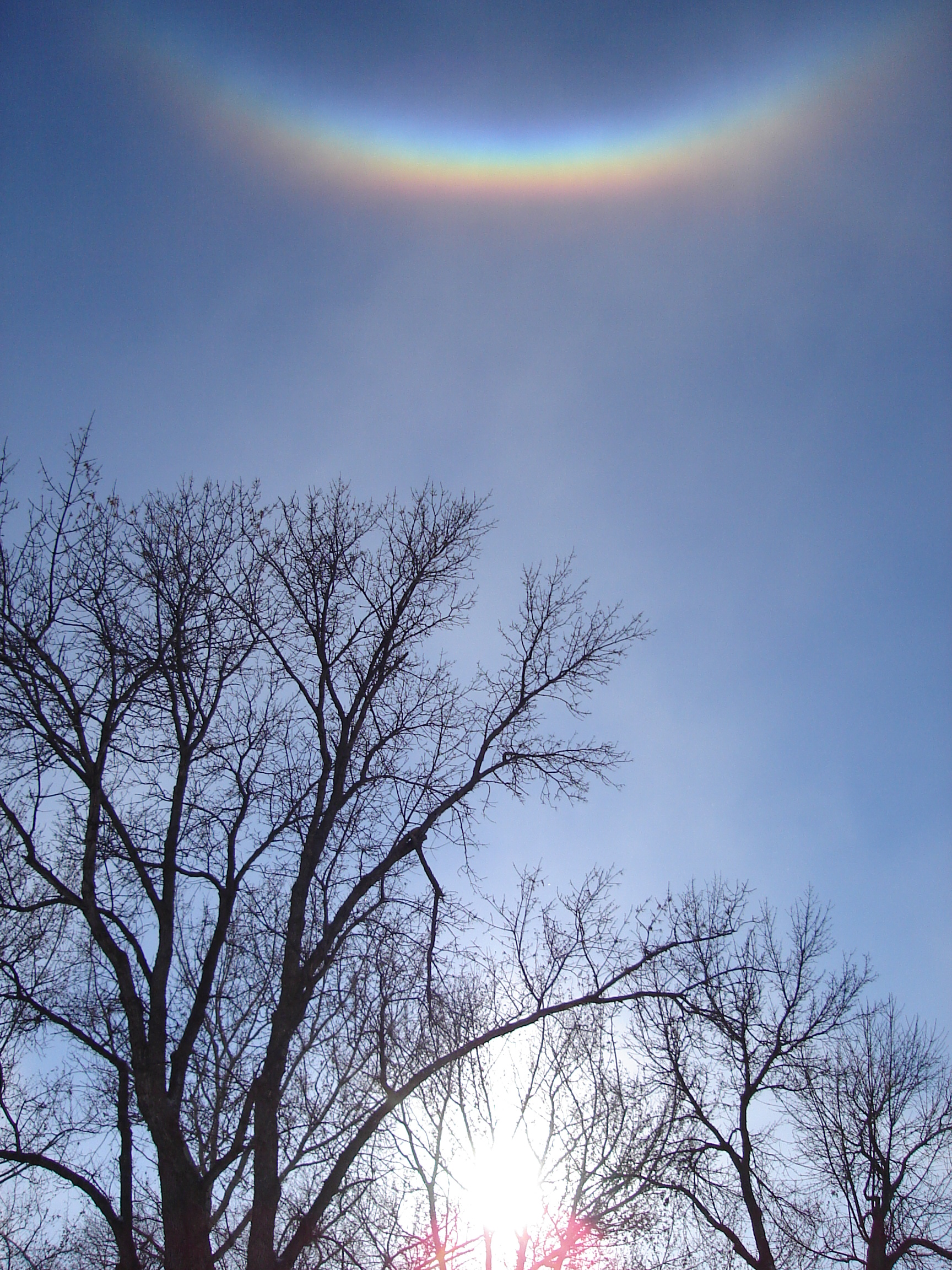
A circumzenithal arc over Grand Forks, North Dakota

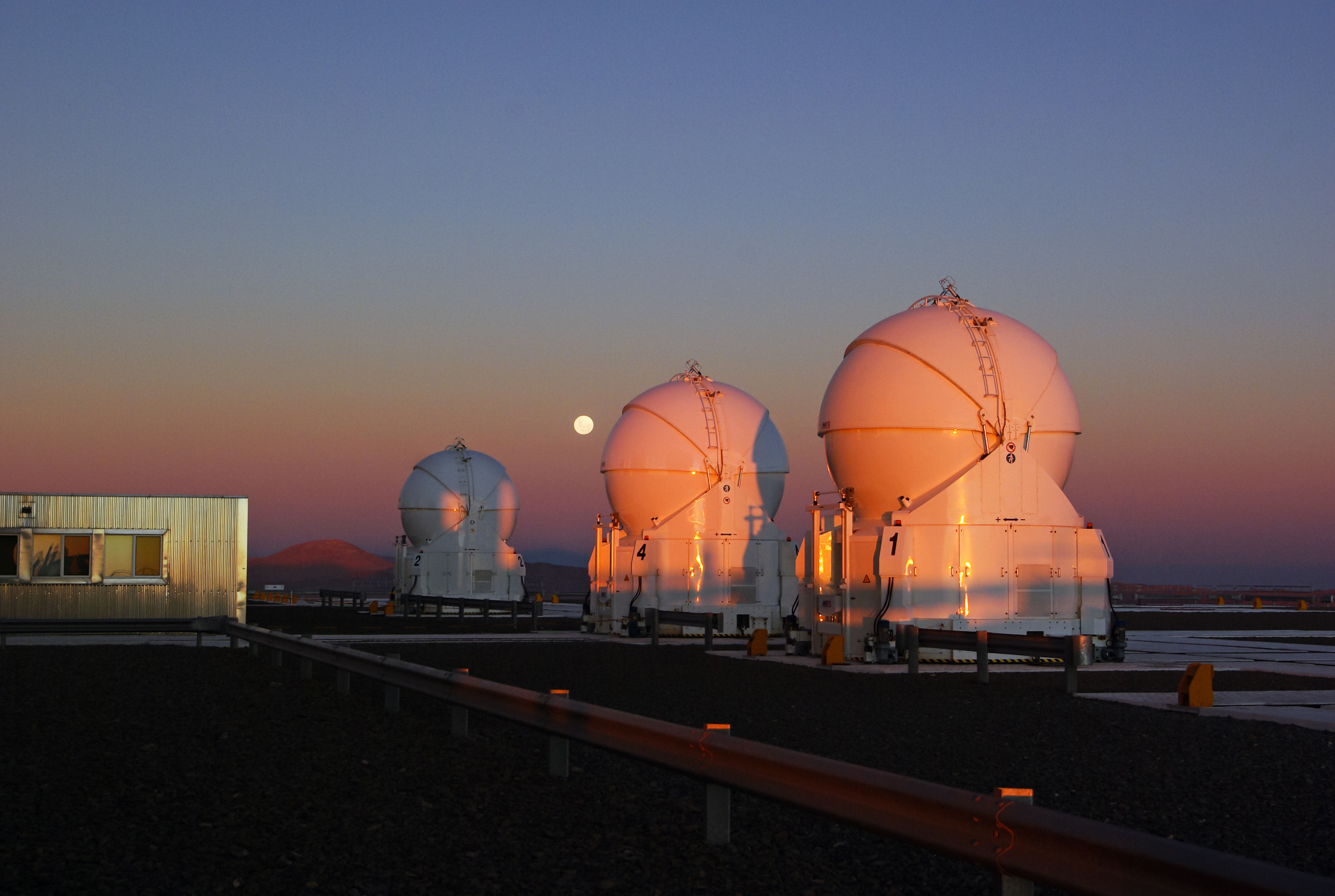
The Belt of Venus over Paranal Observatory atop Cerro Paranal in the Atacama Desert, northern Chile

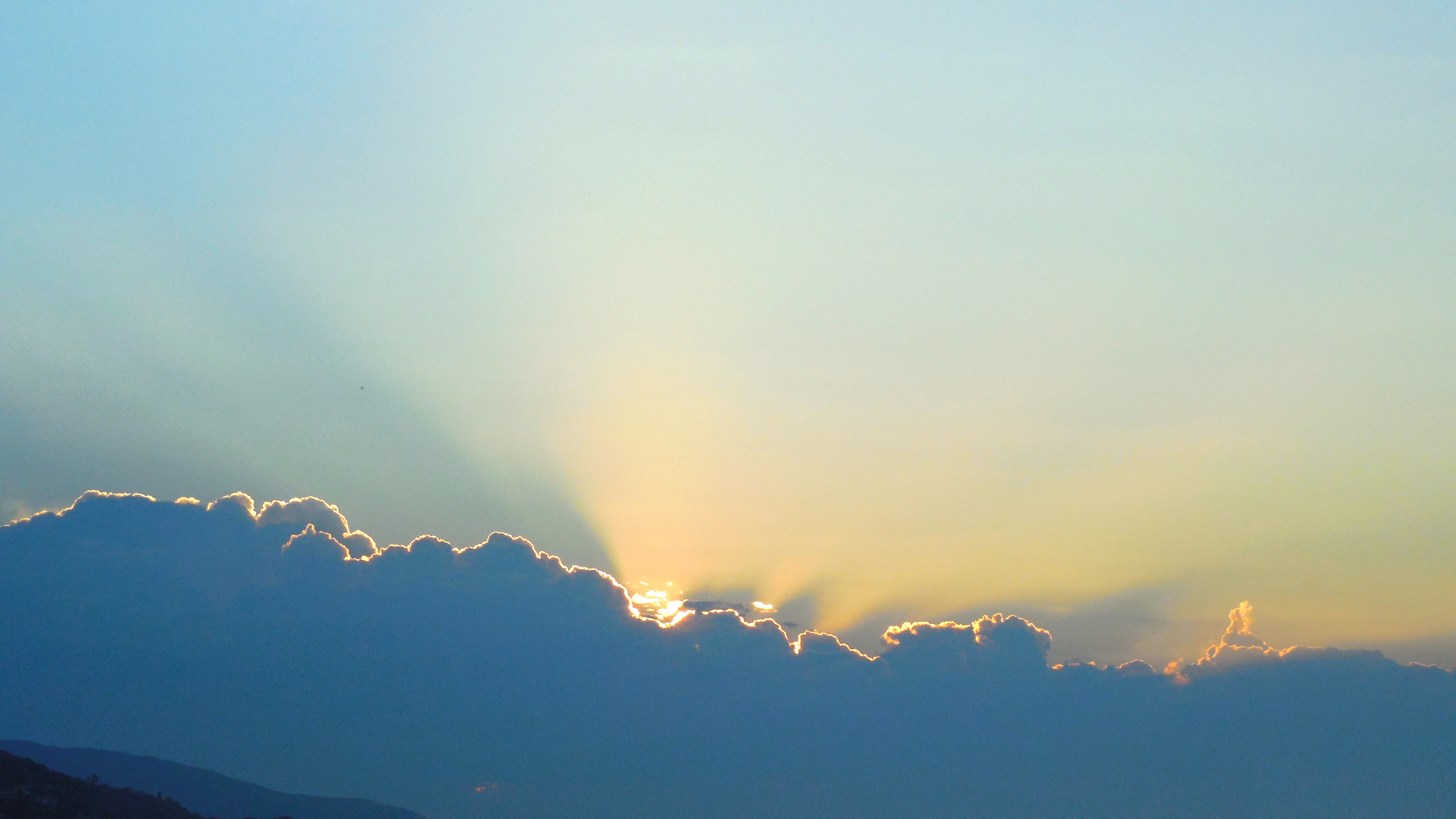
Crepuscular rays at sunrise in Malibu, California

Atmospheric optical phenomena include:

- Afterglow
- Airglow
- Alexander's band, the dark region between the two bows of a double rainbow.
- Alpenglow
- Anthelion
- Anticrepuscular rays
- Aurora (northern and southern lights, aurora borealis and aurora australis)
- Belt of Venus
- Brocken Spectre
- Circumhorizontal arc
- Circumzenithal arc
- Cloud iridescence
- Crepuscular rays
- Earth's shadow
- Earthquake lights
- Glories
- Green flash
- Halos, of Sun or Moon, including sun dogs
- Haze
- Heiligenschein or halo effect, partly caused by the opposition effect
- Ice blink
- Light pillar
- Lightning
- Mirages (including Fata Morgana)
- Monochrome Rainbow
- Moon dog
- Moonbow
- Nacreous cloud/Polar stratospheric cloud
- Rainbow
- Sprite (lightning)
- Subsun
- Sun dog
- Tangent arc
- Tyndall effect
- Upper-atmospheric lightning, including red sprites, Blue jets, and ELVES
- Water sky

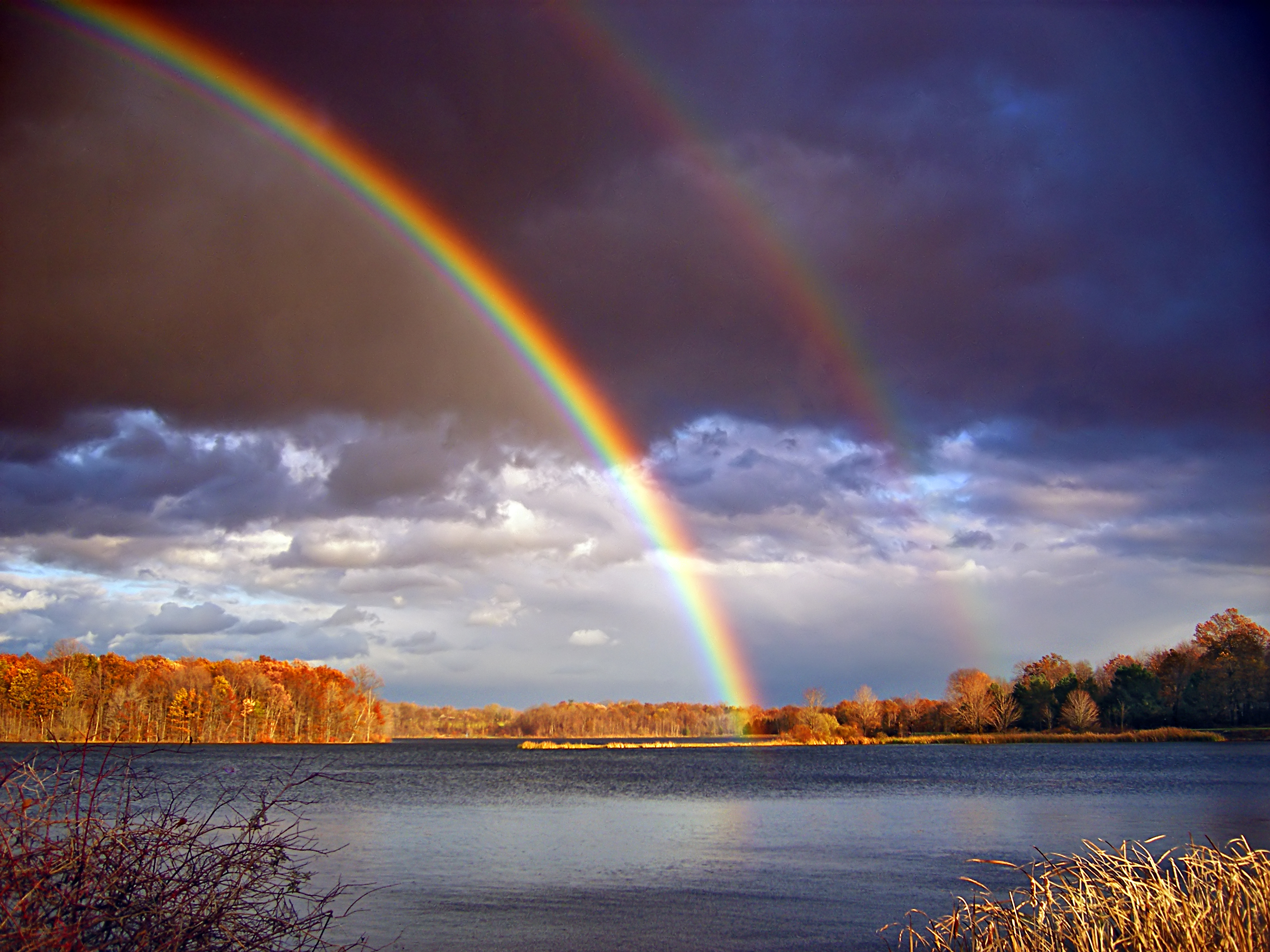
A double rainbow at Minsi Lake, Pennsylvania

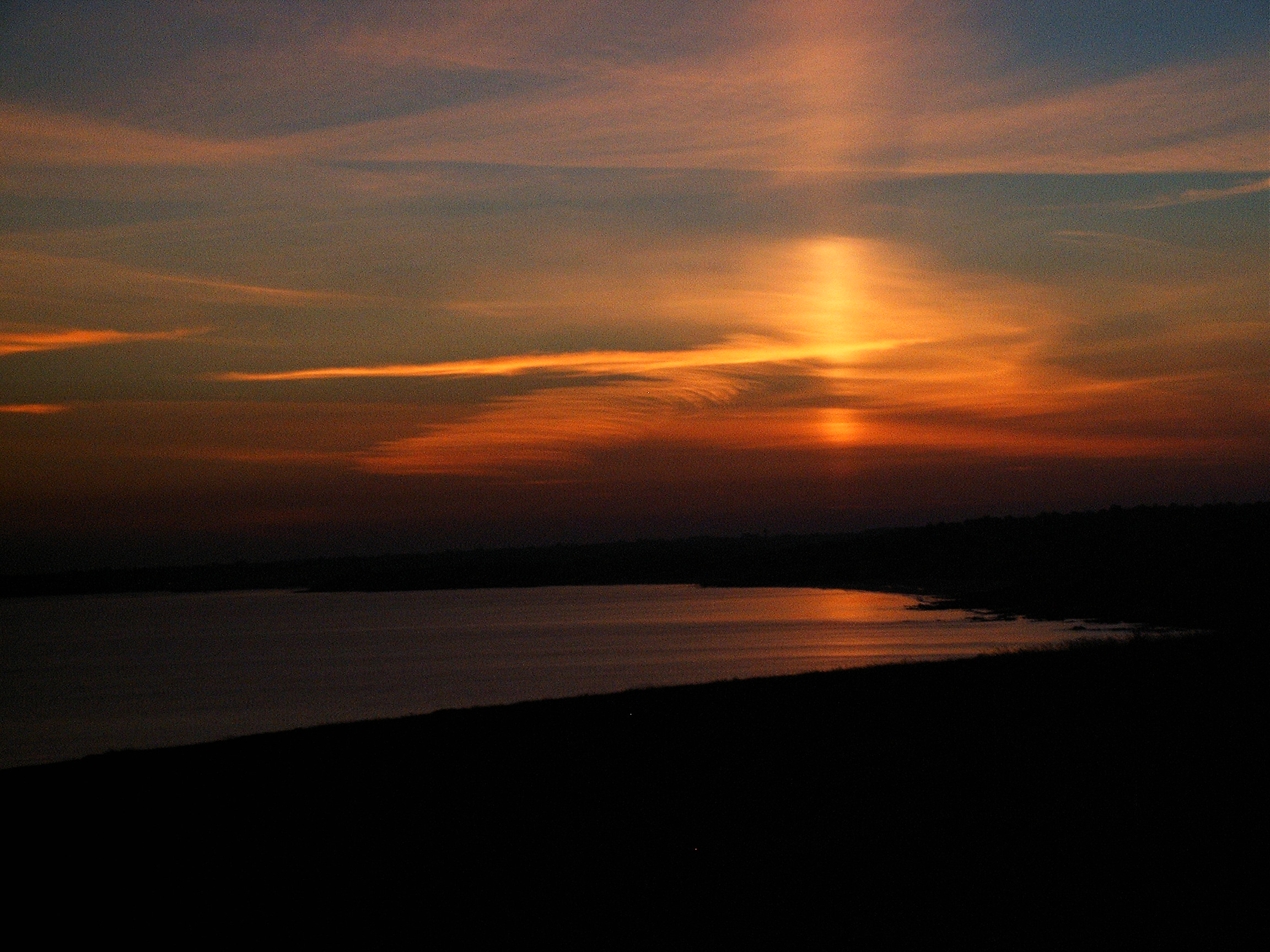
A sun pillar in Finistère, Brittany

Atmospheric optical phenomenon

== See also ==
- Alpenglow
- Nacreous cloud
- Noctilucent cloud
- Sunset#Colors
- Sunrise#Colors
