= Belt of Venus =

Atmospheric phenomenon

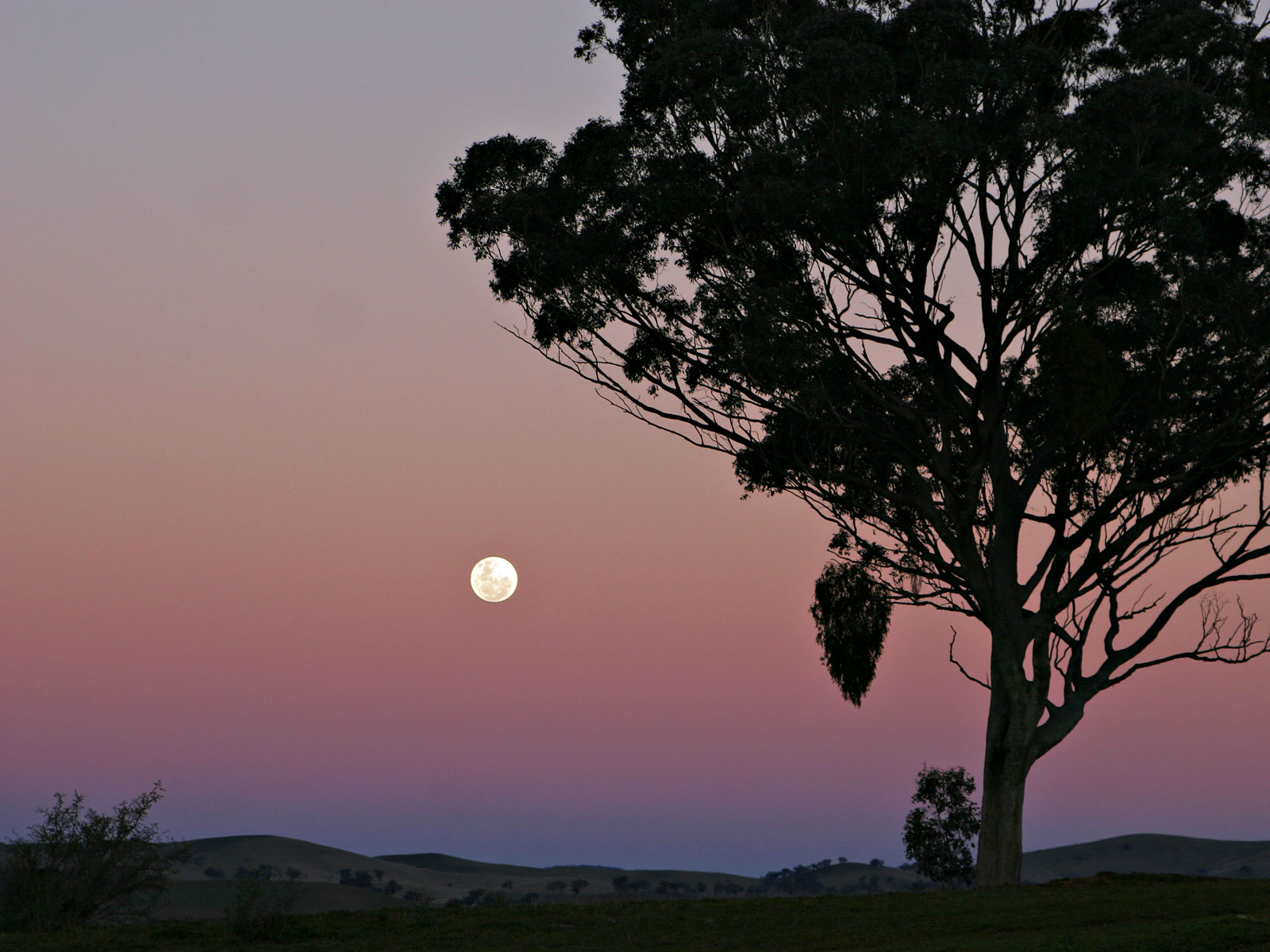
A full Moon rising through the Belt of Venus. (Note that the Moon is near the centre of the field of view, which means that the Sun must have set below the horizon behind the camera.)

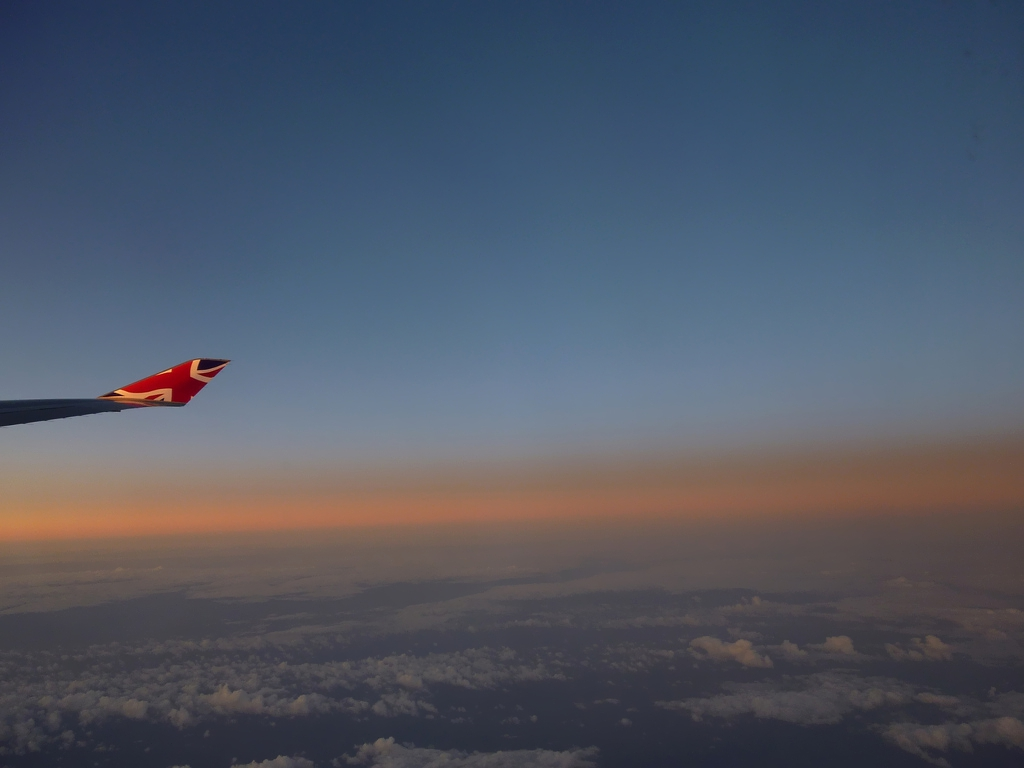
The Belt of Venus as seen from an airliner at an altitude of 42,000 ft (13 km; 8.0 mi)

An animated sequence of the Belt of Venus at dusk, showing how its appearance evolves during evening twilight

The Belt of Venus, also called Venus's Girdle, the antitwilight arch, or antitwilight, is an atmospheric phenomenon visible shortly before dawn or after dusk, during twilight. It is a pinkish glow that surrounds the observer, extending roughly 10–20° above the horizon. It appears opposite to the afterglow, which it also reflects.

In a way, the Belt of Venus is actually alpenglow visible near the horizon during twilight, above the antisolar point. Like alpenglow, the backscatter of reddened sunlight also creates the Belt of Venus. Though unlike alpenglow, the sunlight scattered by fine particulates that cause the rosy arch of the Belt shines high in the atmosphere and lasts for a while after sunset or before sunrise.

As twilight progresses, the arch is separated from the horizon by the dark band of Earth's shadow, or the "twilight wedge". The pinkish glow is due to the Rayleigh scattering of light from the rising or setting Sun, which is then backscattered by particulates. A similar effect can be seen on a "blood moon" during a total lunar eclipse. The zodiacal light and gegenschein, which are caused by the diffuse reflection of sunlight from interplanetary dust in the Solar System, are also similar phenomena.

The Belt of Venus can be observed as having a vivider pink color during the winter months, as opposed to the summer months, when it appears faded and dim above the yellowish-orange band near the horizon. This is due to colder air having less absolute humidity, keeping it clearer, and a more stable atmosphere.

The name of the phenomenon alludes to the cestus, a girdle or breast-band, of the Ancient Greek goddess Aphrodite, customarily equated with the Roman goddess Venus. Since the greatest elongation (angular separation between the Sun and a Solar System body) of Venus is only 45–48°, the inferior planet never appears in the opposite of the Sun's direction (180° difference in ecliptic longitude) from Earth and is thus never located in the Belt of Venus.

The effect may have inspired the nickname "City of the Violet Crown" given to Athens, Greece and Austin, Texas.

== See also ==
- Anticrepuscular rays
- Atmospheric refraction
- Blue hour
- Earth's shadow
- Golden hour or Magic hour
