= City of the Violet Crown =

Term used to describe Athens, Greece, and Austin, Texas

City of the Violet Crown (Ancient Greek: ἰοστέφανοι Ἀθᾶναι) is a term for at least two cities, Athens, Greece, and Austin, Texas.

== Athens, Greece ==
In a surviving fragment, the Greek lyricist poet Pindar wrote of Athens: "O shining and violet-crowned and celebrated in song, bulwark of Hellas, famous Athens, divine citadel."

The climate of Attica is characterised by low humidity and a high percentage of dust in the air, which make sunsets display hues of violet and purple and the surrounding mountains often appear immersed in a purple haze. In Geoffrey Trease's 1952 historical novel about ancient Athens, The Crown of Violet, the name is explained as referring to the mauve-tinted marble of the Acropolis hill.

== Austin, Texas ==
Reference to Austin as "City of the Violet Crown" was long believed to have originated in O. Henry's story "Tictocq: The Great French Detective, In Austin," published in his local newspaper The Rolling Stone on October 27, 1894 (and later reprinted in his book Rolling Stones, posthumously published in 1913). O. Henry wrote:

The drawing-rooms of one of the most magnificent private residences in Austin are ablaze of lights. Carriages line the streets in front, and from gate to doorway is spread a velvet carpet, on which the delicate feet of the guests may tread. The occasion is the entrée into society of one of the fairest buds in the City of the Violet Crown.

However, an earlier reference to Austin as "City of the Voilet Crown" appeared in the The Austin Daily Statesman (now The Austin American-Statesman) on January 31, 1888, in an editorial which extolled the virtues of Austin and compared the city to Athens in purple prose:

No town in Texas possesses natural advantages superior to Austin. It is called the Capitol City, but situated as it is, upon hills crowned with violets, it might be called the "City of the Violet Crown," whose purple tints are kissed by the rising and setting sun. Rich in educational institutions, this southern Athens unfurls her literary ensign, which shines like a meteor of jeweled thoughts.

In the same newspaper, the phrase was the headline of a similar editorial on July 3, 1891, and was used again in the edition of August 8, 1894: "May 5,1890, was a memorable day in Austin. It was memorable for the reason that on that day the citizens of the City of the Violet Crown voted to build a granite dam across the Colorado River..." Thus, the phrase had entered common parlance well before it was used by O. Henry.

The phrase is thought to refer to the atmospheric phenomenon more commonly known as the Belt of Venus. A further explanation is that, during the 19th century, residents began to call Austin the "Athens of the South" for its university, inspiring city boosters to also adopt the nickname of Athens, "City of the Violet Crown." The phrase has erroneously been connected to the moonlight towers of Austin, but these were not installed until 1895.

Another theory is that the Violet Crown in Austin is crepuscular rays. This phenomenon occurs when the sun sets over the higher elevations to the west of Austin.
