= Monochrome rainbow =

Atmospheric optical and meteorological phenomenon

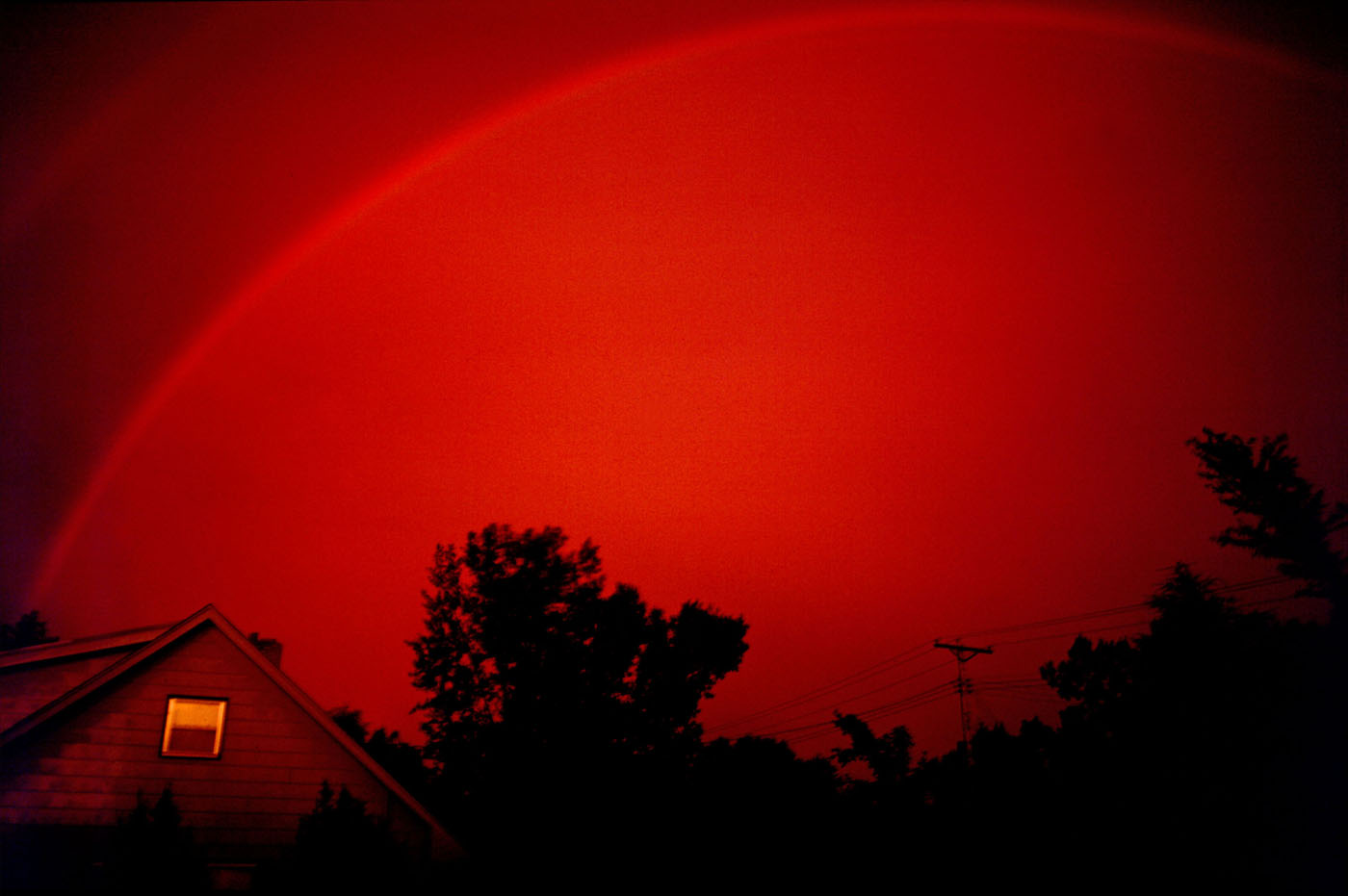
Unenhanced photo of a Red Rainbow, taken near Minneapolis, Minnesota, USA in July 1980

A monochrome or red rainbow is an optical and meteorological phenomenon and a rare variation of the more commonly seen multicolored rainbow. Its formation process is identical to that of a normal rainbow (namely the reflection/refraction of light in water droplets), the difference being that a monochrome rainbow requires the sun to be close to the horizon; i.e., near sunrise or sunset. The low angle of the sun results in a longer distance for its light to travel through the atmosphere, causing shorter wavelengths of light, such as blue, green and yellow, to be scattered and leaving primarily red, hence the name "monochrome rainbow". In the lower light environment where the phenomenon most often forms, a monochrome rainbow can leave a highly dramatic effect.

In July 1877, Silvanus P. Thompson witnessed a red and orange rainbow over Lake Lucerne in Switzerland:

showed only red and orange colours in place of its usual array of hues. No fewer than five supernumerary arcs were visible at the inner edge of the primary bow, and these showed red only.

Along with Thompson's report, there were other reports as well.

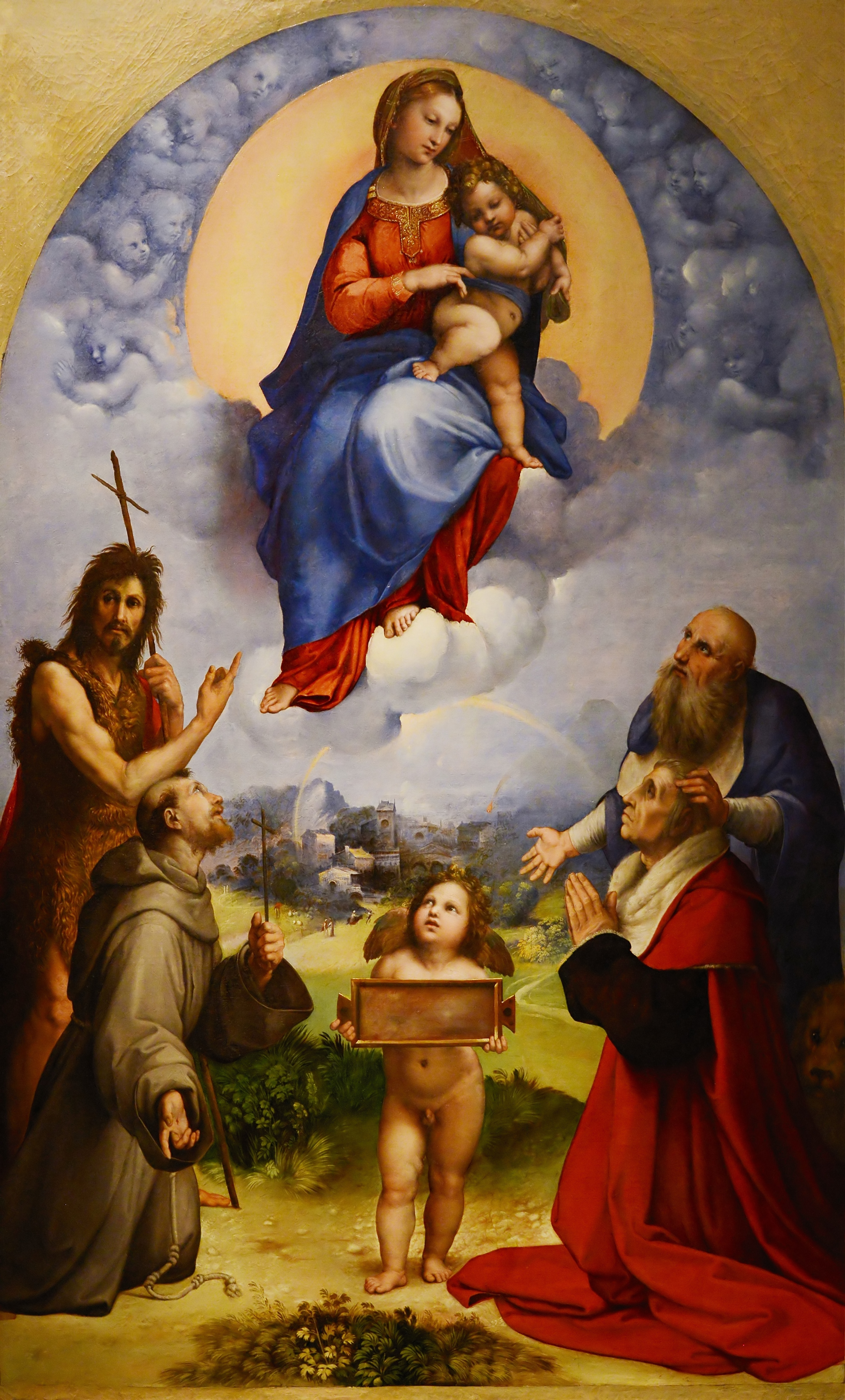
Madonna of Foligno

In the background of Madonna of Foligno, there is a monochrome rainbow in orange.

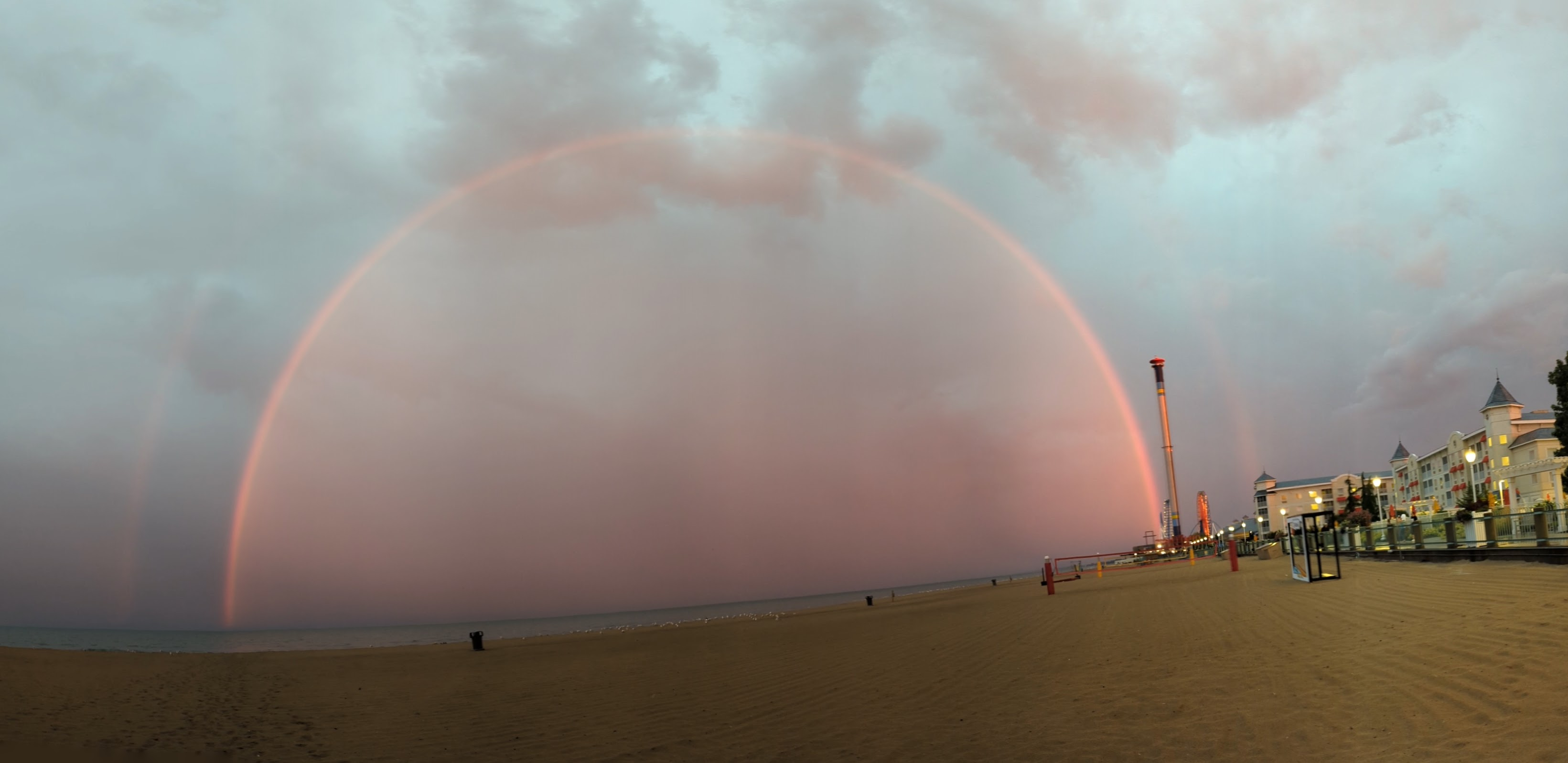
A double Red Rainbow taken from Cedar Point beach in Sandusky, OH. August 29, 2022. Sunset
