= Alpenglow =

Reddish glow on the horizon opposite the Sun just after it sets

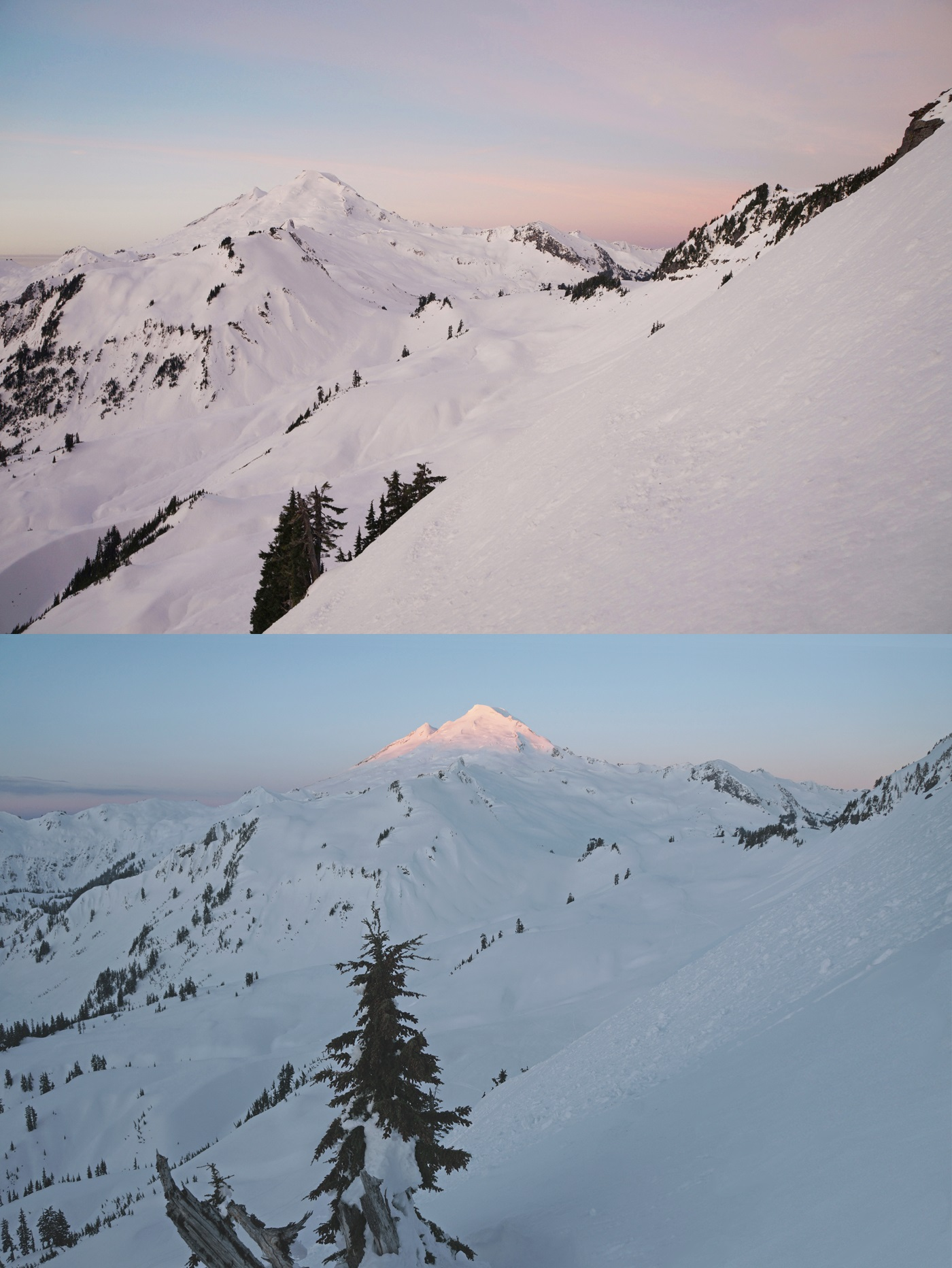
top: reflected alpenglow; bottom: direct sunrise alpenglow from Table Mountain to Mount Baker, WA, USA.

Solar ray 1 is the lowest from the Sun – the Sun is set. Solar ray 2 is reflected in the (snow) clouds to the observer.

Alpenglow (from German: Alpenglühen, lit. 'Alps glow'; Italian: enrosadira) is an optical phenomenon that appears as a horizontal reddish glow near the horizon opposite to the Sun when the solar disk is just below the horizon.

== Description ==
Strictly speaking, alpenglow refers to indirect sunlight reflected or diffracted by the atmosphere after sunset or before sunrise. This diffuse illumination creates soft shadows in addition to the reddish color. The term is also used informally to include direct illumination by the reddish light of the rising or setting sun, with sharply defined shadows.

=== Reflected sunlight ===
When the Sun is below the horizon, sunlight has no direct path to reach a mountain. Unlike the direct sunlight around sunrise or sunset, the light that causes alpenglow is reflected off airborne precipitation, ice crystals, or particulates in the lower atmosphere. These conditions differentiate between direct sunlight around sunrise or sunset and alpenglow.

The term is generally confused to be any sunrise or sunset light reflected off the mountains or clouds, but alpenglow in the strict sense of the word is not direct sunlight and is only visible after sunset or before sunrise.

After sunset, if mountains are absent, aerosols in the eastern sky can be illuminated in a similar way by the remaining scattered reddish light above the fringe of Earth's shadow. This backscattered light produces a pinkish band opposite of the Sun's direction, called the Belt of Venus.

=== Direct sunlight ===
Alpenglow in a looser sense may refer to any illumination by the rosy or reddish light of the setting or rising Sun.

== See also ==
- Golden hour (photography)
