= Anticrepuscular rays =

Meteorological optical phenomenon

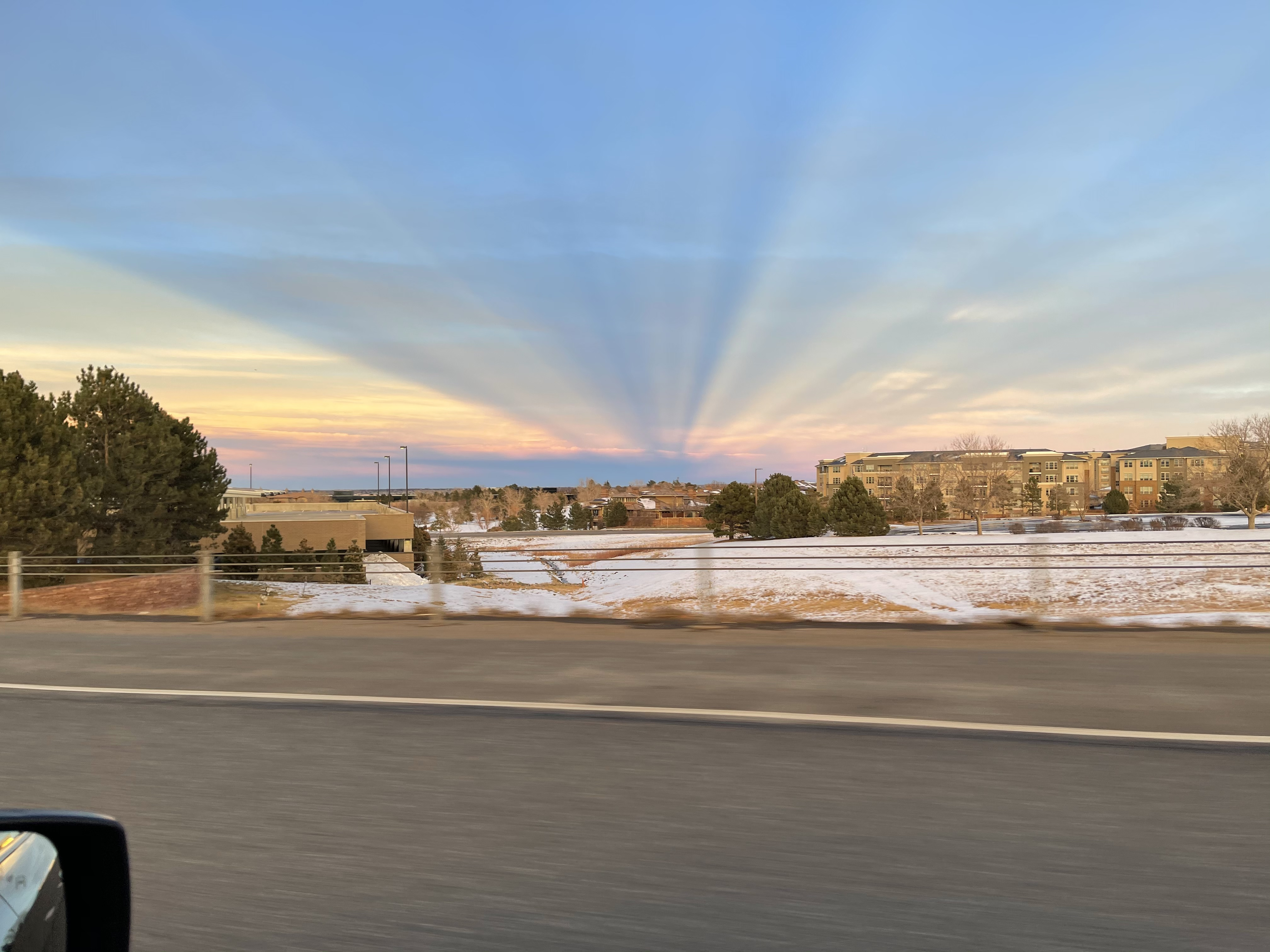
Anticrepuscular rays toward the eastern horizon, as seen from Colorado at dusk

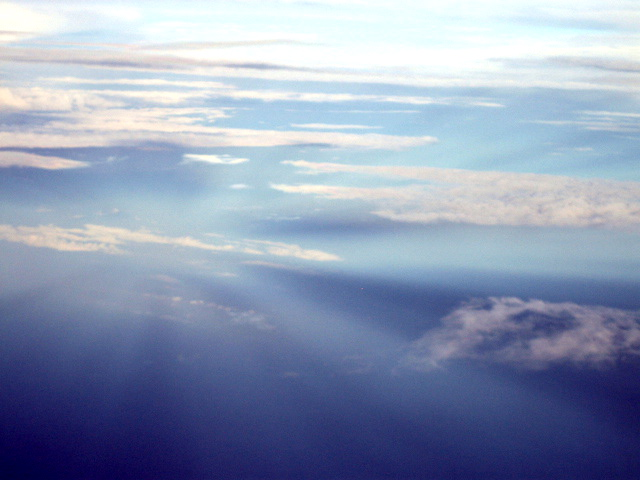
These anticrepuscular rays appear to converge at the antisolar point, as seen from an aircraft above the clouded ocean.

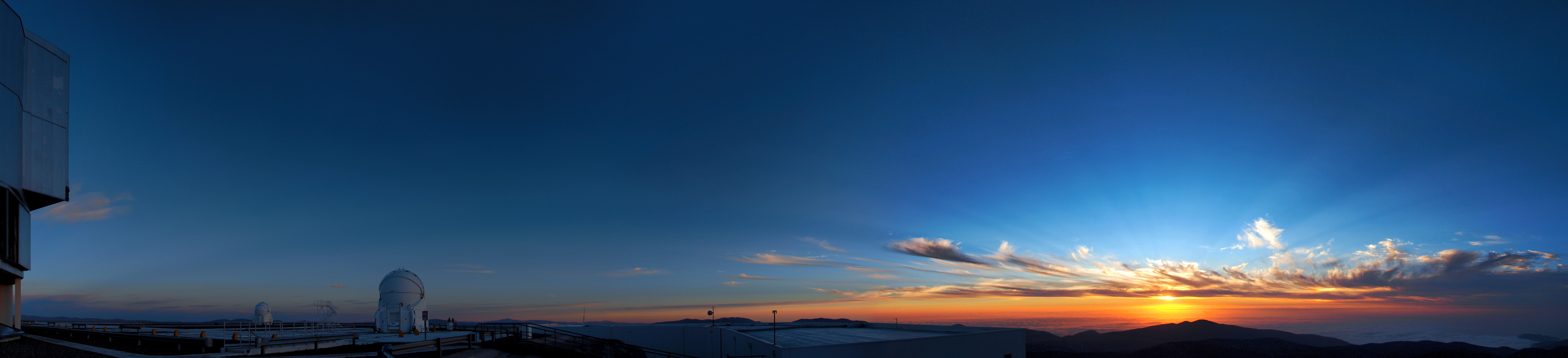
Panoramic image showing both crepuscular and antisolar rays

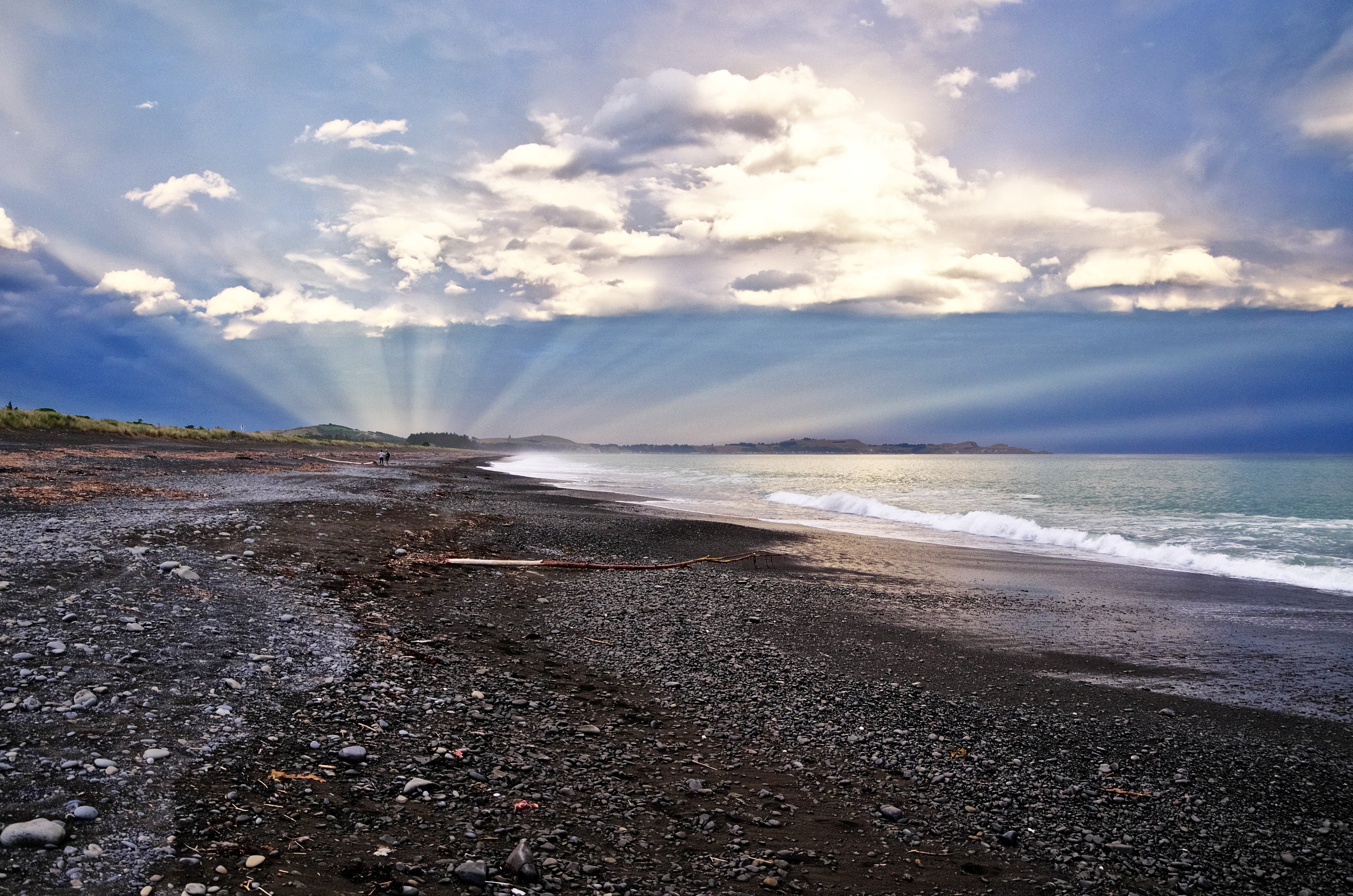
Anticrepuscular rays at Kaikōura, South Island, New Zealand.

Anticrepuscular rays, or antisolar rays, are meteorological optical phenomena similar to crepuscular rays, but appear opposite the Sun in the sky. Anticrepuscular rays are essentially parallel, but appear to converge toward the antisolar point, the vanishing point, due to a visual illusion from linear perspective.

Anticrepuscular rays are most frequently visible around dawn or dusk. This is because the atmospheric light scattering that makes them visible (backscattering) is larger for low angles to the horizon than most other angles. Anticrepuscular rays are dimmer than crepuscular rays because backscattering is less than forward scattering.

Anticrepuscular rays can be continuous with crepuscular rays, curving across the whole sky in great circles.

== Mountain shadow ==
A common example of a single anticrepuscular ray is provided by the shadow of a mountain at sunset, when viewed from the summit. It appears to be triangular, whatever the shape of the mountain, with the apex at the antisolar point.

== Wagon-wheel spokes ==
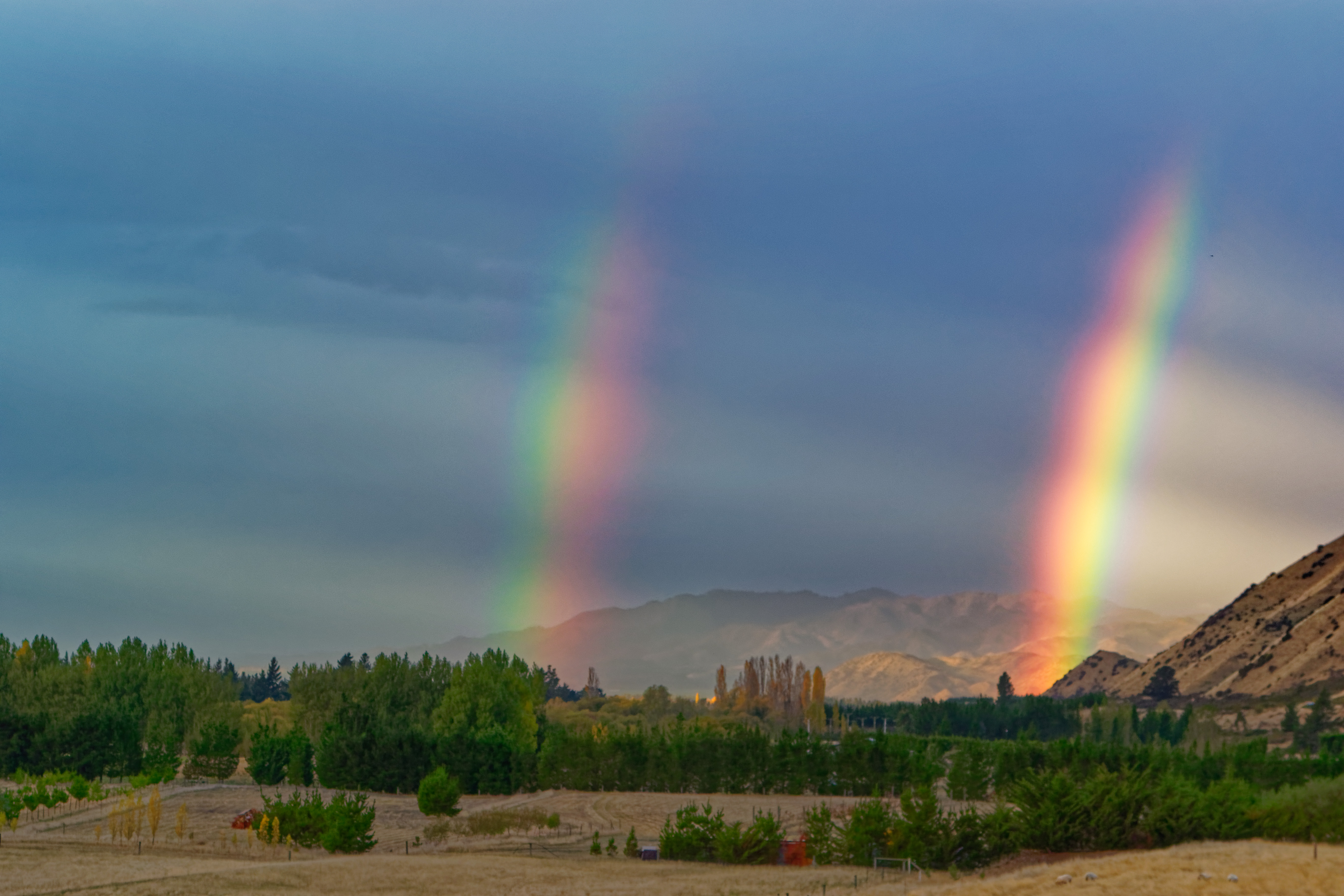
A "wagon-wheel spokes" double rainbow with anti-crepuscular rays, Hurunui, New Zealand

Anticrepuscular rays are sometimes seen enclosed by a rainbow. In this case they can be called wagon-wheel spokes.

== See also ==
- Afterglow
- Earth's shadow
