= Atmospheric duct =

Horizontal layer that propagates electromagnetic radiation

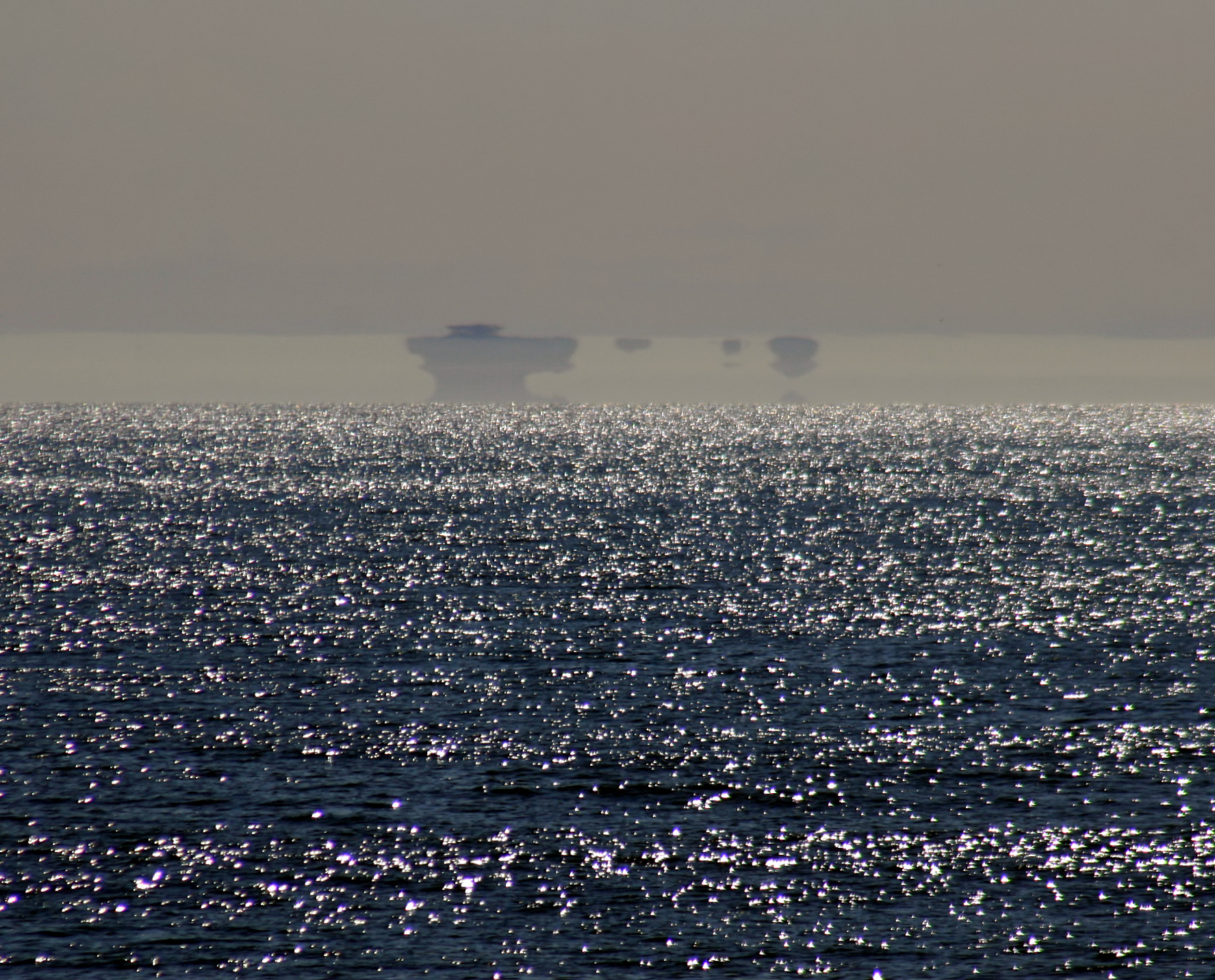
Fata Morgana of Farallon Islands with clearly seen duct

In telecommunications, an atmospheric duct is a horizontal layer in the lower atmosphere in which the vertical refractive index gradients are such that radio signals (and light rays) are guided or ducted, tend to follow the curvature of the Earth, and experience less attenuation in the ducts than they would if the ducts were not present. The duct acts as an atmospheric dielectric waveguide, limiting the spread of the wavefront to only the horizontal dimension.

Atmospheric ducting is a mode of propagation of electromagnetic radiation, usually in the lower layers of Earth’s atmosphere, where the waves are bent by atmospheric refraction. In over-the-horizon radar, ducting causes part of the radiated and target-reflection energy of a radar system to be guided over distances far greater than the normal radar range. It also causes long-distance propagation of radio signals in bands that would normally be limited to line of sight.

Normally radio "ground waves" propagate along the surface as creeping waves. That is, they are only diffracted around the curvature of the earth. This is one reason that early long-distance radio communication used long wavelengths. The best known exception is that HF (3–30 MHz.) waves are reflected by the ionosphere.

The reduced refractive index due to lower densities at the higher altitudes in the Earth's atmosphere bends the signals back toward the Earth. Signals in a higher refractive index layer, i.e., duct, tend to remain in that layer because of the reflection and refraction encountered at the boundary with a lower refractive index material. In some weather conditions, such as inversion layers, density changes so rapidly that waves are guided around the curvature of the earth at constant altitude.

Phenomena of atmospheric optics related to atmospheric ducting include the green flash, Fata Morgana, superior mirage, mock mirage of astronomical objects and the Novaya Zemlya effect.

== See also ==
- Anomalous propagation
- Earth-Ionosphere waveguide
- Predel-E (Russian OTH radar system based on atmospheric ducting)
- Sky wave
- Thermal fade
- Temperature inversion
- Tropospheric ducting
