= Concern Morinformsystem-Agat =

Russian joint stock company

JSC Concern Morinformsystem-Agat
- Native name: Russian: АО Концерн Моринсис-Агат
- Romanized name: AO Kontsern Morinsis-Agat
- Company type: Joint-stock company
- Industry: Defense industry
- Predecessor: SPA Agat; SPA Mars; CRI Kurs; PA Binom; NPP Kaluga Instrument-Making Plant Typhoon
- Founded: February 3, 2004; 22 years ago
- Headquarters: Moscow, Russia
- Area served: Worldwide
- Key people: Hramov Mikhail Urevich (CEO)
- Products: Missiles and related to electronic equipment
- Revenue: 7,512,490,000 Russian ruble (2017)
- Operating income: −117,736,000 Russian ruble (2017)
- Net income: 3,502,000 Russian ruble (2017)
- Total assets: 50,733,607,000 Russian ruble (2017)
- Owner: Marine Instrumentation Corporation (100%)
- Parent: Marine Instrumentation Corporation
- Website: www.concern-agat.ru

Concern Morinformsystem-Agat is a Russian joint stock company that engages in the development and production of integrated structures for the military-industrial sector in the Russian Federation and internationally. The original company was established in 1942 as a Special Design Bureau (SDB) of the People's Commissariat of the Shipbuilding Industry of the USSR.

Morinformsystem-Agat manufactures equipment and instruments for warships. Scientific Production Association Agat is the core company of the concern.

Its products include the Klub-S and Klub-N missile fire-control systems, Bal-E missile systems, MR-123 and Puma (5P-10) artillery systems, and radar stations such as the Predel-E coastal over-the-horizon radar system.

== Direction of activity ==
The Concern is engaged in the development, production, warranty service, modernization, repair and disposal of integrated multifunctional ship control systems, integrated automation tools for controlling naval forces, control systems for marine missile and artillery complexes, combat information and control systems for surface ships and submarines, shipboard automated mine action control systems, shipboard unified computing machines, training complexes, multifunctional ship-based and shore-based radar systems, means of joint use of weapons and fire indication, shipboard and coastal missile systems, as well as sonar systems.

== Directors ==
General Director — General Designer M. Y. Khramov
