= Looming and similar refraction phenomena =

Atmospheric refraction phenomena

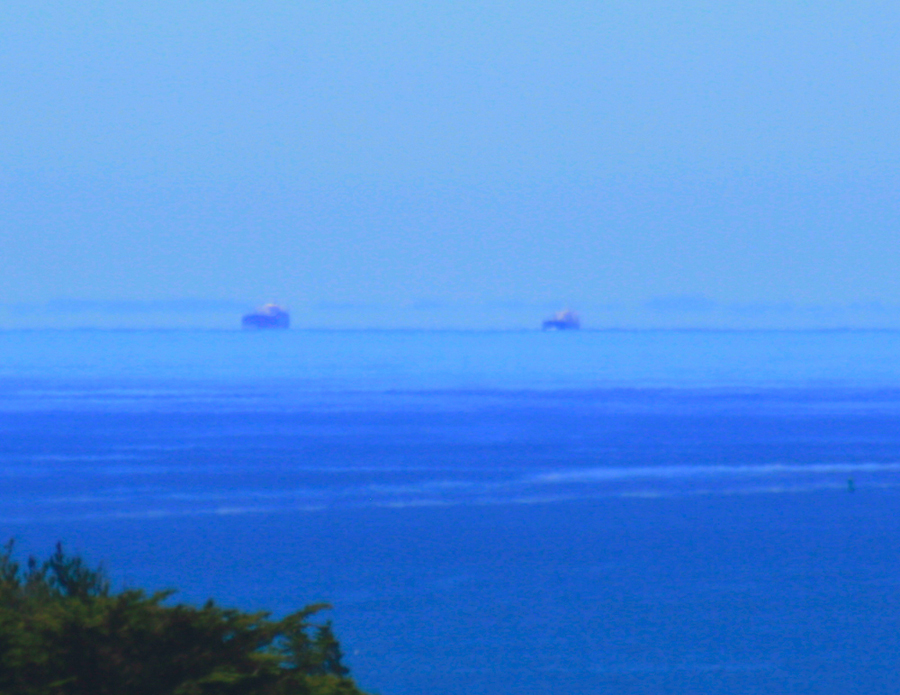
The distant boats appear to be floating in the sky as a result of looming and other refraction phenomena.

While mirages are the best known atmospheric refraction phenomena, looming and similar refraction phenomena do not produce mirages. Mirages show an extra image or images of the miraged object, while looming, towering, stooping, and sinking do not. No inverted image is present in those phenomena either. Depending on atmospheric conditions, the objects can appear to be elevated or lowered, stretched or stooped. These phenomena can occur together, changing the appearance of different parts of the objects in different ways. Sometimes these phenomena can occur together with a true mirage.

== Looming ==
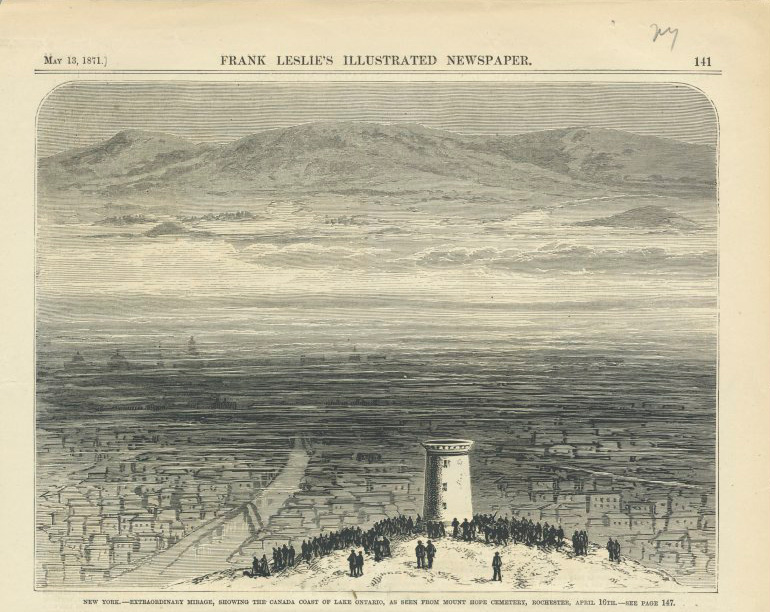
Looming of the Canadian coast as seen from Rochester, New York, on April 16, 1871

Looming is the most noticeable and most often observed of these refraction phenomena. It is an abnormally large refraction of the object that increases the apparent elevation of the distant objects and sometimes allows an observer to see objects that are located below the horizon under normal conditions. One of the most famous looming observations was made by William Latham in 1798, who wrote:

I could very plainly see the cliffs on the opposite coast; which, at the nearest part, are between forty and fifty miles distant, and are not to be discerned, from that low situation, by the aid of the best glasses. They appeared to be only a few miles off, and seemed to extend for some leagues along the coast.

Thomas Jefferson noted the phenomenon of looming in his book Notes on the State of Virginia:

There is a solitary mountain about 40 miles off, in the South, whose natural shape as presented to view there, is a regular cone; but, by the effect of looming it sometimes subsides almost totally into the horizon; sometimes it rises more acute and more elevated, its top flat, and as broad as its base. In short it assumes at times the most whimsical shapes, and all these perhaps successively in the same morning.

He was unable to explain this phenomenon and did not think refraction could account from the perceived changes of shape of the object in question.

Other famous observations that were called "mirages" may actually be referring to looming. One of those was described in Scientific American on August 25, 1894, as "a remarkable mirage seen by the citizens of Buffalo, New York". Such looming—sometimes with apparent magnification of opposite shores—have been reported over the Great Lakes. Canadian shorelines have been observed from Rochester, New York, across Lake Ontario, and from Cleveland across Lake Erie. The landforms over 50 miles (80 km) distant, normally beyond the horizon, were sometimes perceived as 6 miles (10 km) away.

Looming is most commonly seen in the polar regions. Looming was sometimes responsible for the errors made by polar explorers; for example, Charles Wilkes charted the coast of Antarctica, where later only water was found.

The larger the size of the sphere (the planet where an observer is located) the less curved the horizon is. William Jackson Humphreys' calculations showed that an observer may be able to see all the way around a planet of sufficient size and with sufficient atmospheric density gradient.

== Sinking ==
Sinking is the opposite of looming. In sinking, stationary objects that are normally seen above the horizon appear to be lowered, or may even disappear below the horizon. In looming, the curvature of the rays is increasing, while sinking produces the opposite effect. In general, looming is more noticeable than sinking because objects that appear to grow stand out more than those that appear to shrink.

== Towering and stooping ==
Towering and stooping are more complex forms of atmospheric refraction than looming and sinking. While looming and sinking change the apparent elevation of an object, towering and stooping change the apparent shape of the object itself. With towering, objects appear stretched; with stooping, objects seem to be shortened. The apparent stretching and shortening of the objects are not symmetrical and depends on the thermal profile of the atmosphere. The curvature of the rays changes more rapidly in some places because the thermal profile is curved.

== Image example and explanation ==
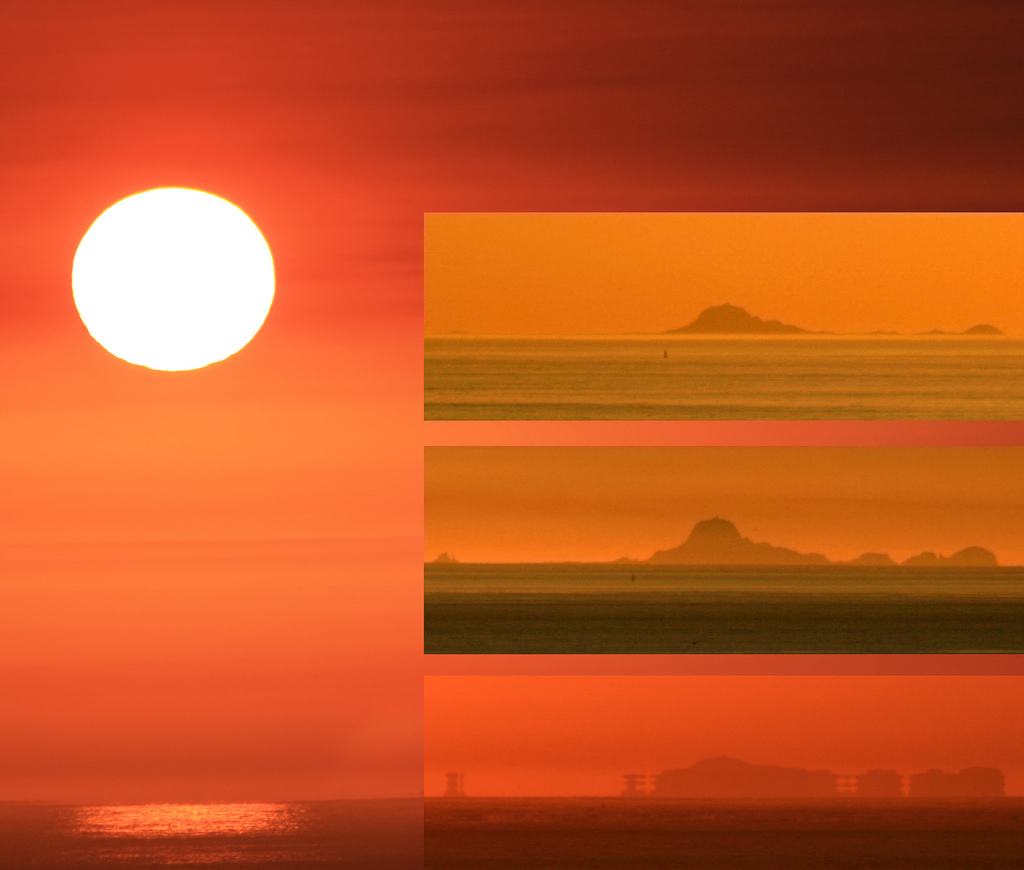
Three photos showing a looming, towering, and Fata Morgana of the Farallon Islands

These three images were taken from the same place on different days under different atmospheric conditions. The top frame shows looming. The island shape is not distorted, but is elevated. The middle frame shows looming with towering. The lowest frame is a 5-image superior mirage of the islands. As the image shows, the different refraction phenomena are not independent from each other and may occur together as a combination, depending on atmospheric conditions.

== See also ==
- Mirage of astronomical objects
- Fata Morgana (mirage)
- Tropospheric propagation
