= Predel-E =

Russian military over-the-horizon radar system

Predel-E (in Russian: Предел-Э) is a Russian military over-the-horizon radar system shown since 2017, designed to detect ships in coastal areas.

It was developed by Concern Morinformsystem-Agat, with at least one variant designed by NPP Salyut. Predel-E relies on a phenomenon known as atmospheric ducting, where certain meteorological conditions create a waveguide at a height of up to several dozen meters above the surface, which significantly increases the range of radar signals above 3 GHz, allowing Predel-E to detect targets at a distance of over 400 km, according to the manufacturer. Predel-E is designed to support the K-300P Bastion-P missile system and other systems.

In August 2023, Ukraine's military announced that it had destroyed a Russian coastal PREDEL-E station in the Kherson region, stating it to have been worth around $200 million.
