= Tropospheric propagation =

Electromagnetic propagation in relation to the troposphere

Diagram of the different layers of the atmosphere.

Tropospheric propagation describes electromagnetic propagation in relation to the troposphere. The service area from a VHF or UHF radio transmitter extends to just beyond the optical horizon, at which point signals start to rapidly reduce in strength. Viewers living in such a "deep fringe" reception area will notice that during certain conditions, weak signals normally masked by noise increase in signal strength to allow quality reception. Such conditions are related to the current state of the troposphere.

Tropospheric propagated signals travel in the part of the atmosphere adjacent to the surface and extending to some 25,000 feet (8 km). Such signals are thus directly affected by weather conditions extending over some hundreds of miles. During very settled, warm anticyclonic weather (i.e., high pressure), usually weak signals from distant transmitters improve in strength. Another symptom during such conditions may be interference to the local transmitter resulting in co-channel interference, usually horizontal lines or an extra floating picture with analog broadcasts and break-up with digital broadcasts. A settled high-pressure system gives the characteristic conditions for enhanced tropospheric propagation, in particular favouring signals which travel along the prevailing isobar pattern (rather than across it). Such weather conditions can occur at any time, but generally the summer and autumn months are the best periods. In certain favourable locations, enhanced tropospheric propagation may enable reception of ultra high frequency (UHF) TV signals up to 1,000 miles (1,600 km) or more.

The observable characteristics of such high-pressure systems are usually clear, cloudless days with little or no wind. At sunset the upper air cools, as does the surface temperature, but at different rates. This produces a boundary or temperature gradient, which allows an inversion level to form – a similar effect occurs at sunrise. The inversion is capable of allowing very high frequency (VHF) and UHF signal propagation well beyond the normal radio horizon distance.

The inversion effectively reduces sky wave radiation from a transmitter – normally VHF and UHF signals travel on into space when they reach the horizon, the refractive index of the ionosphere preventing signal return. With temperature inversion, however, the signal is to a large extent refracted over the horizon rather than continuing along a direct path into outer space.

Fog also produces good tropospheric results, again due to inversion effects. Fog occurs during high-pressure weather, and if such conditions result in a large belt of fog with clear sky above, there will be heating of the upper fog level and thus an inversion. This situation often arises towards night fall, continues overnight and clears with the sunrise over a period of around 4 – 5 hours.

== Tropospheric ducting ==
Tropospheric ducting is a type of radio propagation that tends to happen during periods of stable, anticyclonic weather. In this propagation method, when the signal encounters a rise in temperature in the atmosphere instead of the normal decrease (known as a temperature inversion), the higher refractive index of the atmosphere there will cause the signal to be bent. Tropospheric ducting affects all frequencies, and signals enhanced this way tend to travel up to 800 miles (1,300 km) (though some people have received "tropo" beyond 1,000 miles / 1,600 km), while with tropospheric-bending, stable signals with good signal strength from 500+ miles (800+ km) away are not uncommon when the refractive index of the atmosphere is fairly high.

Tropospheric ducting of radio and television signals is relatively common during the summer and autumn months, and is the result of change in the refractive index of the atmosphere at the boundary between air masses of different temperatures and humidities. Using an analogy, it can be said that the denser air at ground level slows the wave front a little more than does the rare upper air, imparting a downward curve to the wave travel.

Ducting can occur on a very large scale when a large mass of cold air is overrun by warm air. This is termed a temperature inversion, and the boundary between the two air masses may extend for 1,000 miles (1,600 km) or more along a stationary weather front.

Temperature inversions occur most frequently along coastal areas bordering large bodies of water. This is the result of natural onshore movement of cool, humid air shortly after sunset when the ground air cools more quickly than the upper air layers. The same action may take place in the morning when the rising sun warms the upper layers.

Even though tropospheric ducting has been occasionally observed down to 40 MHz, the signal levels are usually very weak. Higher frequencies above 90 MHz are generally more favourably propagated.

High mountainous areas and undulating terrain between the transmitter and receiver can form an effective barrier to tropospheric signals. Ideally, a relatively flat land path between the transmitter and receiver is ideal for tropospheric ducting. Sea paths also tend to produce superior results.

In certain parts of the world, notably the Mediterranean Sea and the Persian Gulf, tropospheric ducting conditions can become established for many months of the year to the extent that viewers regularly receive quality reception of signals over distances of 1,000 miles (1,600 km). Such conditions are normally optimum during very hot settled summer weather.

Tropospheric ducting over water, particularly between California and Hawaii, Brazil and Africa, Australia and New Zealand, Australia and Indonesia, Strait of Florida, and Bahrain and Pakistan, has produced VHF/UHF reception ranging from 1000 to 3,000 miles (1,600 – 4,800 km). A US listening post was built in Ethiopia to exploit a common ducting of signals from southern Russia.

Tropospheric signals exhibit a slow cycle of fading and will occasionally produce signals sufficiently strong for noise-free stereo, reception of Radio Data System (RDS) data, and solid locks of HD Radio streams on FM, noise-free, color TV pictures, or stable DTV reception, as well as stable DAB Radio reception. With DVB-T it can also enable a wide SFN, so long as the two transmitters are within a guard interval and are almost equidistant from the receiver as well as synchronised. However, if they are not synchronised and are not equidistant they will interfere with each other.

Virtually all long-distance reception of digital television occurs by tropospheric ducting (due to most, but not all, TV stations broadcasting in the UHF band).

== Notable and record distance tropospheric DX receptions ==
"DXing is the art and science of listening to distant stations." The ARRL, association for amateur radio maintains the list of North American distance records, which includes tropo results.

- On October 18, 1975, Rijn Muntjewerff, the Netherlands, received UHF channel E34 Pajala, Sweden, at a distance of 1,150 miles (1,851 km).
- On June 13, 1989, Shel Remington, Keaau, Hawaii, received several 88–108 MHz FM signals from Tijuana, Mexico, at a distance of 2,536 miles (4,081 km).
- Throughout the 1990s, Fernando Garcia, located at what could be considered an ideal tropospheric DX location near Monterrey, Mexico, received numerous 1,000+ mile (1,600+ km) stations via tropospheric propagation, both over the Gulf of Mexico and past land. Among his receptions are WGNT-27 from Portsmouth, Virginia, at a distance of 1,608 miles (2,588 km) and low-power (LPTV) station W38BB from Raleigh, North Carolina, at a distance of 1,460 miles (2,350 km)
- On May 11, 2003, Jeff Kruszka, living in south Louisiana, received a few UHF DTV signals from 800+ miles. The longest of these was WNCN-DT, channel 55, Goldsboro, North Carolina, at a distance of 835 miles (1,344 km) (at the time, the record for UHF DTV).
- On December 9, 2004, Polish DXer Maciej Ługowski received the British TV stations Channel 5 (on UHF ch.37 from the Croydon transmitter) and BBC2 (UHF ch.46 from Bluebell Hill transmitter) near Warsaw, Poland at 1,466 kilometres (911 mi) and 1,427 kilometres (887 mi), respectively.
- On October 15, 2006, a German DXer known on YouTube as EifelDX received the Norge Mux on channel E58, transmitter Oslo, with a distance of 1,085 kilometres (674 mi).
- On the late evening of June 19, 2007 and into the early morning hours of June 20, 2007, three DXers in eastern Massachusetts, Jeff Lehmann, Keith McGinnis, and Roy Barstow, received FM signals from southern Florida via tropo. All three logged WEAT 104.3 West Palm Beach, Florida, and WRMF 97.9 Palm Beach, Florida, at distances of around 1,200 miles (1,931 km), and Barstow logged WHDR 93.1 Miami, Florida, at a distance of 1,210 miles (1,947 km).
- On December 17, 2007, Polish DXer Maciej Ługowski received BBC Radio Scotland on 93,7 MHz from Keelylang Hill (Orkney Islands) transmitter near Warsaw, Poland at 1,706 km (1,060 mi) distance. BBC Scotland reception continued for next two days.
- On November 3, 2008, Swedish Radio Amateur Kjell Jarl SM7GVF contacted Russian Radio Amateur RA6HHT
  at a distance of 2,315 km (1,438 mi) on 144Mhz.
- On April 23, 2009, a San Antonio-area DXer received WFTS-TV 28's digital signal from Tampa, Florida, at a distance of 995 miles (1,601 km).
- On the late evening of August 24 into the afternoon of August 25, 2009, a DX'er in Burnt River, Ontario, Canada, received several FM radio stations via tropo from Arkansas, Illinois, Iowa, Kansas, Michigan, Missouri, Ohio, Oklahoma, Pennsylvania, and Wisconsin.
- On September 28, 2016, European tropospheric FM DX record was newly set by Jürgen Bartels in Süllwarden, Northern Germany who received Spanish station RNE5TN on 93.7 MHz from Santiago de Compostela/Monte Pedroso transmitter at 1,715 km (1,066 mi) distance.
- On September 27 and 28, 2017, various DXers in northeastern Europe observed extreme ducting in VHF broadcast band. Top distance was achieved by Łukasz K. in Tomaszów Mazowiecki, Poland, who reported signals from Kolari transmitter, northern Finland at 1,798 km (1,117 mi).
- On October 10, 2018, Ukrainian DXer Vladimir Doroshenko (MrVlaDor) received a signal from Danish transmitter Holstebro/Mejrup in Dnipro at a distance of 1,960 km (1,220 mi). It sets the new tropo FM DX record for Europe. At the same time, FM DXers in Poland received FM radiostations from Moscow for the first time via troposphere at distances 1,100 kilometres (684 mi) – 1,300 kilometres (808 mi).
- On July 16, 2023, an Australian DXer known on YouTube as VK2KRR received UHF television signals from Port Pirie at The Rock Hill in NSW, at a distance of 860 km (530 mi). This ultimately sets a new tropo UHF DTV DX record for Australia.

== See also ==
- MW DX
- Skywave
- Radio propagation
- Tropospheric scatter
- Velocity of propagation
- Thermal fade
- Clear-channel station
- Federal Standard 1037C
- Looming and similar refraction phenomena
