= Wind gradient =

Rate of increase in wind strength per unit increase in height

In common usage, wind gradient, more specifically wind speed gradient or wind velocity gradient, or alternatively shear wind, is the vertical component of the spatial gradient of the mean horizontal wind speed in the lower atmosphere. It is the rate of increase of wind strength with unit increase in height above ground level. In metric units, it is often measured in units of speed (meters per second) divided by units of height (kilometers), resulting in m/s/km, which reduces to a multiple of the standard unit of shear rate, inverse seconds (s^{−1}).

== Simple explanation ==
Surface friction forces the surface wind to slow and turn near the surface of the Earth, blowing directly towards the low pressure, when compared to the winds in the nearly frictionless flow well above the Earth's surface. This bottom layer, where surface friction slows the wind and changes the wind direction, is known as the planetary boundary layer. Daytime solar heating due to insolation thickens the boundary layer, as air warmed by contact with the Earth's hot surface rises up and increasingly mixes with air higher up. Radiative cooling overnight gradually decouples the winds at the surface from the winds above the boundary layer, increasing vertical wind shear near the surface, also known as wind gradient.

== Characterization ==
Typically, due to aerodynamic drag, there is a wind gradient in the wind flow, especially in the first few hundred meters above the Earth's surface—the surface layer of the planetary boundary layer. Wind speed increases with increasing height above the ground, starting from zero due to the no-slip condition. Flow near the surface encounters obstacles that reduce the wind speed, and introduce random vertical and horizontal velocity components at right angles to the main direction of flow. This turbulence causes vertical mixing between the air moving horizontally at various levels, which has an effect on the dispersion of pollutants, dust and airborne sand and soil particles.

The reduction in velocity near the surface is a function of surface roughness. Wind velocity profiles are quite different for different terrain types. Rough, irregular ground, and man-made obstructions on the ground, retard movement of the air near the surface, reducing wind velocity. Because of the relatively smooth water surface, wind speeds do not decrease as much close to the sea as they do on land. Over a city or rough terrain, the wind gradient effect could cause a reduction of 40% to 50% of the geostrophic wind speed aloft; while over open water or ice, the reduction may be only 20% to 30%.

For engineering purposes, the wind gradient is modeled as a simple shear exhibiting a vertical velocity profile varying according to a power law with a constant exponential coefficient based on surface type. The height above ground where surface friction has a negligible effect on wind speed is called the "gradient height" and the wind speed above this height is assumed to be a constant called the "gradient wind speed". For example, typical values for the predicted gradient height are 457 m for large cities, 366 m for suburbs, 274 m for open terrain, and 213 m for open sea.

Although the power law exponent approximation is convenient, it has no theoretical basis. When the temperature profile is adiabatic, the wind speed should vary logarithmically with height, Measurements over open terrain in 1961 showed good agreement with the logarithmic fit up to 100 m or so, with near constant average wind speed up through 1000 m.

The shearing of the wind is usually three-dimensional, that is, there is also a change in direction between the 'free' pressure-driven geostrophic wind and the wind close to the ground. This is related to the Ekman spiral effect. The cross-isobar angle of the diverted ageostrophic flow near the surface ranges from 10° over open water, to 30° over rough hilly terrain, and can increase to 40°-50° over land at night when the wind speed is very low.

After sundown the wind gradient near the surface increases, with the increasing stability. Atmospheric stability occurring at night with radiative cooling tends to contain turbulent eddies vertically, increasing the wind gradient. The magnitude of the wind gradient is largely influenced by the height of the convective boundary layer and this effect is even larger over the sea, where there is no diurnal variation of the height of the boundary layer as there is over land. In the convective boundary layer, strong mixing diminishes vertical wind gradient.

== Implications ==
=== Engineering ===
The design of buildings must account for wind loads, and these are affected by wind gradient. The respective gradient levels, usually assumed in the Building Codes, are 500 meters for cities, 400 meters for suburbs, and 300 m for flat open terrain. For engineering purposes, a power law wind speed profile may be defined as follows:
$$v_z = v_g \cdot \left( \frac {z} {z_g} \right)^ {1 / \alpha},  0 < z < z_g$$
where:

- $v_z$ = wind speed at height $z$
- $v_g$ = wind speed at gradient height $z_g$
- $\alpha$ = exponential coefficient

==== Wind turbines ====
Wind turbine operation is affected by wind gradient. Vertical wind-speed profiles result in different wind speeds at the blades nearest to the ground level compared to those at the top of blade travel, which results in asymmetric load. The wind gradient can create a large bending moment in the shaft of a two-bladed turbine when the blades are vertical. The reduced wind gradient over water means shorter and less expensive wind turbine towers can be used in windparks which are placed in (shallow) seas. It would be preferable for wind turbines to be tested in a wind tunnel simulating the wind gradient that they will eventually see, but this is rarely done.

For wind turbine engineering, a polynomial variation in wind speed with height can be defined relative to wind measured at a reference height of 10 meters as:
$$\ v_w(h) = v_{10} \cdot \left( \frac {h} {h_{10}} \right)^ a$$
where:

- $v_w(h)$ = velocity of the wind [m/s], at height $h$
- $v_{10}$ = velocity of the wind [m/s], at height $h_{10}$ = 10 meters
- $a$ = Hellmann exponent

The Hellmann exponent depends upon the coastal location and the shape of the terrain on the ground, and the stability of the air. Examples of values of the Hellmann exponent are given in the table below:

Location	a
Unstable air above open water surface	0.06
Neutral air above open water surface	0.10
Unstable air above flat open coast	0.11
Neutral air above flat open coast	0.16
Stable air above open water surface	0.27
Unstable air above human inhabited areas	0.27
Neutral air above human inhabited areas	0.34
Stable air above flat open coast	0.40
Stable air above human inhabited areas	0.60

=== Gliding ===
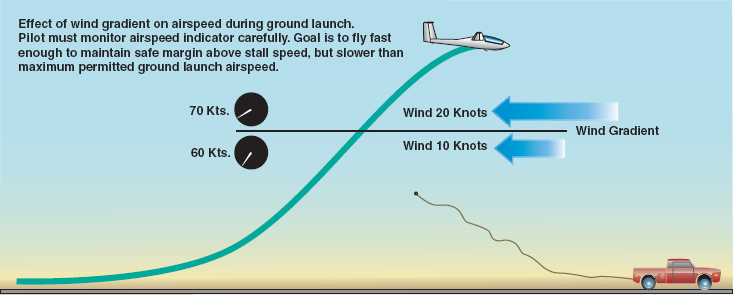
Glider ground launch wind gradient effect.

In gliding, wind gradient affects the takeoff and landing phases of flight of a glider. Wind gradient can have a noticeable effect on ground launches. If the wind gradient is significant or sudden, or both, and the pilot maintains the same pitch attitude, the indicated airspeed will increase, possibly exceeding the maximum ground launch tow speed. The pilot must adjust the airspeed to deal with the effect of the gradient.

When landing, wind gradient is also a hazard, particularly when the winds are strong. As the glider descends through the wind gradient on final approach to landing, airspeed decreases while sink rate increases, and there is insufficient time to accelerate prior to ground contact. The pilot must anticipate the wind gradient and use a higher approach speed to compensate for it.

Wind gradient is also a hazard for aircraft making steep turns near the ground. It is a particular problem for gliders which have a relatively long wingspan, which exposes them to a greater wind speed difference for a given bank angle. The different airspeed experienced by each wing tip can result in an aerodynamic stall on one wing, causing a loss of control accident. The rolling moment generated by the different airflow over each wing can exceed the aileron control authority, causing the glider to continue rolling into a steeper bank angle.

=== Sailing ===
In sailing, wind gradient affects sailboats by presenting a different wind speed to the sail at different heights along the mast. The direction also varies with height, but sailors refer to this as "wind shear."

The mast head instruments indication of apparent wind speed and direction is different from what the sailor sees and feels near the surface. Sailmakers may introduce sail twist in the design of the sail, where the head of the sail is set at a different angle of attack from the foot of the sail in order to change the lift distribution with height. The effect of wind gradient can be factored into the selection of twist in the sail design, but this can be difficult to predict since the wind gradient may vary widely in different weather conditions. Sailors may also adjust the trim of the sail to account for wind gradient, for example using a boom vang.

According to one source, the wind gradient is not significant for sailboats when the wind is over 6 knots (because a wind speed of 10 knots at the surface corresponds to 15 knots at 300 meters, so the change in speed is negligible over the height of a sailboat's mast). According to the same source, the wind increases steadily with height up to about 10 meters in 5 knot winds but less if there is less wind. That source states that in winds with average speeds of six knots or more, the change of speed with height is confined almost entirely to the one or two meters closest to the surface. This is consistent with another source, which shows that the change in wind speed is very small for heights over 2 meters and with a statement by the Australian Government Bureau of Meteorology according to which differences can be as little as 5% in unstable air.

In kitesurfing, the wind gradient is even more important, because the power kite is flown on 20-30m lines, and the kitesurfer can use the kite to jump off the water, bringing the kite to even greater heights above the sea surface.

=== Sound propagation ===
Wind gradient can have a pronounced effect upon sound propagation in the lower atmosphere. This effect is important in understanding sound propagation from distant sources, such as foghorns, thunder, sonic booms, gunshots or other phenomena like mistpouffers. It is also important in studying noise pollution, for example from roadway noise and aircraft noise, and must be considered in the design of noise barriers. When wind speed increases with altitude, wind blowing towards the listener from the source will refract sound waves downwards, resulting in increased noise levels downwind of the barrier. These effects were first quantified in the field of highway engineering to address variations of noise barrier efficacy in the 1960s.

When the sun warms the Earth's surface, there is a negative temperature gradient in atmosphere. The speed of sound decreases with decreasing temperature, so this also creates a negative sound speed gradient. The sound wave front travels faster near the ground, so the sound is refracted upward, away from listeners on the ground, creating an acoustic shadow at some distance from the source. The radius of curvature of the sound path is inversely proportional to the velocity gradient.

A wind speed gradient of 4 (m/s)/km can produce refraction equal to a typical temperature lapse rate of 7.5 °C/km. Higher values of wind gradient will refract sound downward toward the surface in the downwind direction, eliminating the acoustic shadow on the downwind side. This will increase the audibility of sounds downwind. This downwind refraction effect occurs because there is a wind gradient; the sound is not being carried along by the wind.

There will usually be both a wind gradient and a temperature gradient. In that case, the effects of both might add together or subtract depending on the situation and the location of the observer. The wind gradient and the temperature gradient can also have complex interactions. For example, a foghorn can be audible at a place near the source, and a distant place, but not in a sound shadow between them. In the case of transverse sound propagation, wind gradients do not sensibly modify sound propagation relative to the windless condition; the gradient effect appears to be important only in upwind and downwind configurations.

For sound propagation, the exponential variation of wind speed with height can be defined as follows:
$$U(h) = U(0) h ^ \zeta$$
$$\frac {dU} {dh} = \zeta \frac {U(h)} {h}$$
where:

- $U(h)$ = speed of the wind at height $h$, and $U(0)$ is a constant
- $\zeta$ = exponential coefficient based on ground surface roughness, typically between 0.08 and 0.52
- $\frac {dU} {dh}$ = expected wind gradient at height $h$

In the 1862 American Civil War Battle of Iuka, an acoustic shadow, believed to have been enhanced by a northeast wind, kept two divisions of Union soldiers out of the battle, because they could not hear the sounds of battle only six miles downwind.

Scientists have understood the effect of wind gradient upon refraction of sound since the mid-1900s; however, with the advent of the U.S. Noise Control Act, this refractive phenomenon was widely used beginning in the early 1970s, chiefly in the consideration of noise propagation from highways and resultant design of transportation facilities.

=== Wind gradient soaring ===
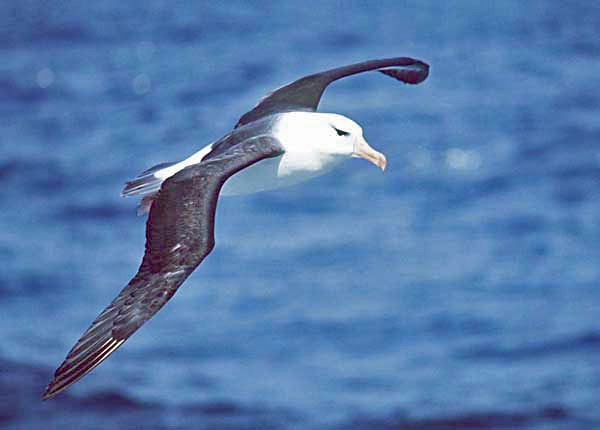
This albatross is an expert in dynamic soaring using the wind gradient.

Wind gradient soaring, also called dynamic soaring, is a technique used by soaring birds including albatrosses. If the wind gradient is of sufficient magnitude, a bird can climb into the wind gradient, trading ground speed for height, while maintaining airspeed. By then turning downwind, and diving through the wind gradient, they can also gain energy.

== See also ==
- Wind shear
