= Spatial gradient =

Gradient whose components are spatial derivatives

A spatial gradient is a gradient whose components are spatial derivatives, i.e., rate of change of a given physical quantity with respect to the position coordinates in physical space. Homogeneous regions have spatial gradient vector norm equal to zero.

When evaluated over vertical position (altitude or depth), it is called vertical derivative or vertical gradient; the remainder is called horizontal gradient component, the vector projection of the full gradient onto the horizontal plane. The spatial gradient of a scalar is a vector quantity whereas the gradient of a vector is a tensor quantity.

Examples:

Biology

- Concentration gradient, the ratio of solute concentration between two adjoining regions
- Potential gradient, the difference in electric charge between two adjoining regions

Fluid dynamics and earth science

- Density gradient
- Pressure gradient
- Temperature gradient
  - Geothermal gradient
  - Sound speed gradient
- Wind gradient
- Lapse rate

== See also ==
- Grade (slope)
- Gradiometer
- Image gradient
- Time derivative
- Material derivative
- Structure tensor
- Surface gradient
