= Sound speed gradient =

Rate of change of speed of sound with distance

In acoustics, the sound speed gradient is the rate of change of the speed of sound with distance, for example with depth in the ocean, or height in the Earth's atmosphere. A sound speed gradient leads to refraction of sound wavefronts in the direction of lower sound speed, causing the sound rays to follow a curved path. The radius of curvature of the sound path is inversely proportional to the gradient.

When the sun warms the Earth's surface, there is a negative temperature gradient in atmosphere. The speed of sound decreases with decreasing temperature, so this also creates a negative sound speed gradient. The sound wave front travels faster near the ground, so the sound is refracted upward, away from listeners on the ground, creating an acoustic shadow at some distance from the source. The opposite effect happens when the ground is covered with snow, or in the morning over water, when the sound speed gradient is positive. In this case, sound waves can be refracted from the upper levels down to the surface.

In underwater acoustics, speed of sound depends on pressure (hence depth), temperature, and salinity of seawater, thus leading to vertical speed gradients similar to those that exist in atmospheric acoustics. However, when there is a zero sound speed gradient, values of sound speed have the same "isospeed" in all parts of a given water column (there is no change in sound speed with depth). The same effect happens in an isothermal atmosphere with the ideal gas assumption.

== See also ==
- SOFAR channel
- Wind gradient
