= Lewin Brzeski =

Town in Opole Voivodeship, Poland

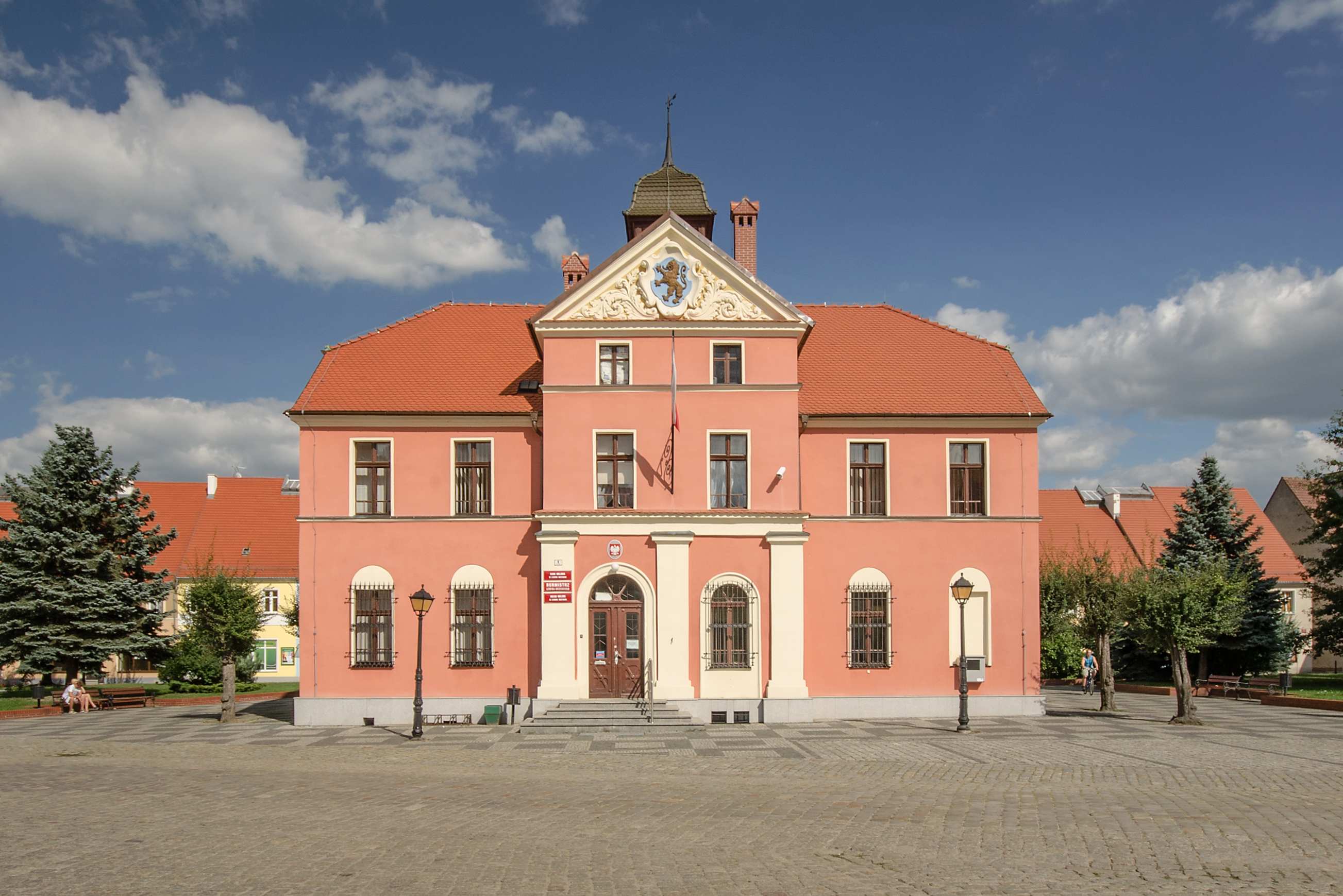
- Lewin Brzeski Town Hall

- Flag Coat of arms

- Location within Poland
- Coordinates: 50°44′59″N 17°37′8″E
- Country: Poland
- Voivodeship: Opole
- County: Brzeg
- Gmina: Lewin Brzeski

Area
  - Total: 10.35 km^{2} (4.00 sq mi)
- Elevation: 145 m (476 ft)

Population (2019-06-30)
  - Total: 5,736
  - Density: 554.2/km^{2} (1,435/sq mi)
- Time zone: UTC+1 (CET)
  - Summer (DST): UTC+2 (CEST)
- Postal code: 49–340
- Vehicle registration: OB
- Website: http://lewin-brzeski.pl

Lewin Brzeski [ˈlɛvʲin ˈbʐɛskʲi] (German: Löwen; Silesian: Lwy) is a historic town situated in Brzeg County, Opole Voivodeship, south-western Poland. The total population of Lewin Brzeski was estimated at 5,736 inhabitants in 2019.

== Etymology ==
The name is of Polish origin, and comes from either the word łowić, which means "to hunt" or from the name of supposed founder Lew (Old Polish variant of the name Leon).

== History ==
Located along the medieval trade routes from Silesia to Hungary, by the Amber Road and the Eastern Neisse river, the town of Lewin first developed in the Middle Ages as a market town, located within the Piast-ruled Kingdom of Poland and as a result of the fragmentation of Poland it became part of the duchies of Opole, Brzeg and Legnica. It is first mentioned in a contract from 1257, when a monastery run by the Knights Hospitaller in Łosiów purchased a mill near the town.

As early as the mid-13th century the city had received Magdeburg town rights, which granted the town a certain amount of autonomy. The town was built around a rectangular marketplace, and surrounded by a rampart with a palisade with a ditch below it that could, if necessary, through the opening of a lock could be filled with water from the Eastern Neisse. In addition, there were four city gates. In 1333 the town was granted new rights and privileges, such as the brewing of beer and the holding of Wednesday markets, by Duke Bolesław III the Generous. Lewin switched between the duchies of Legnica and Brzeg and remained under the rule of the Piast dynasty until 1675, although it fell under the suzerainty of the Bohemian (Czech) Crown in 1329, Hungary in 1469, and again Bohemia in 1490, then ruled by the Jagiellonian dynasty until 1526 and the House of Habsburg afterwards.

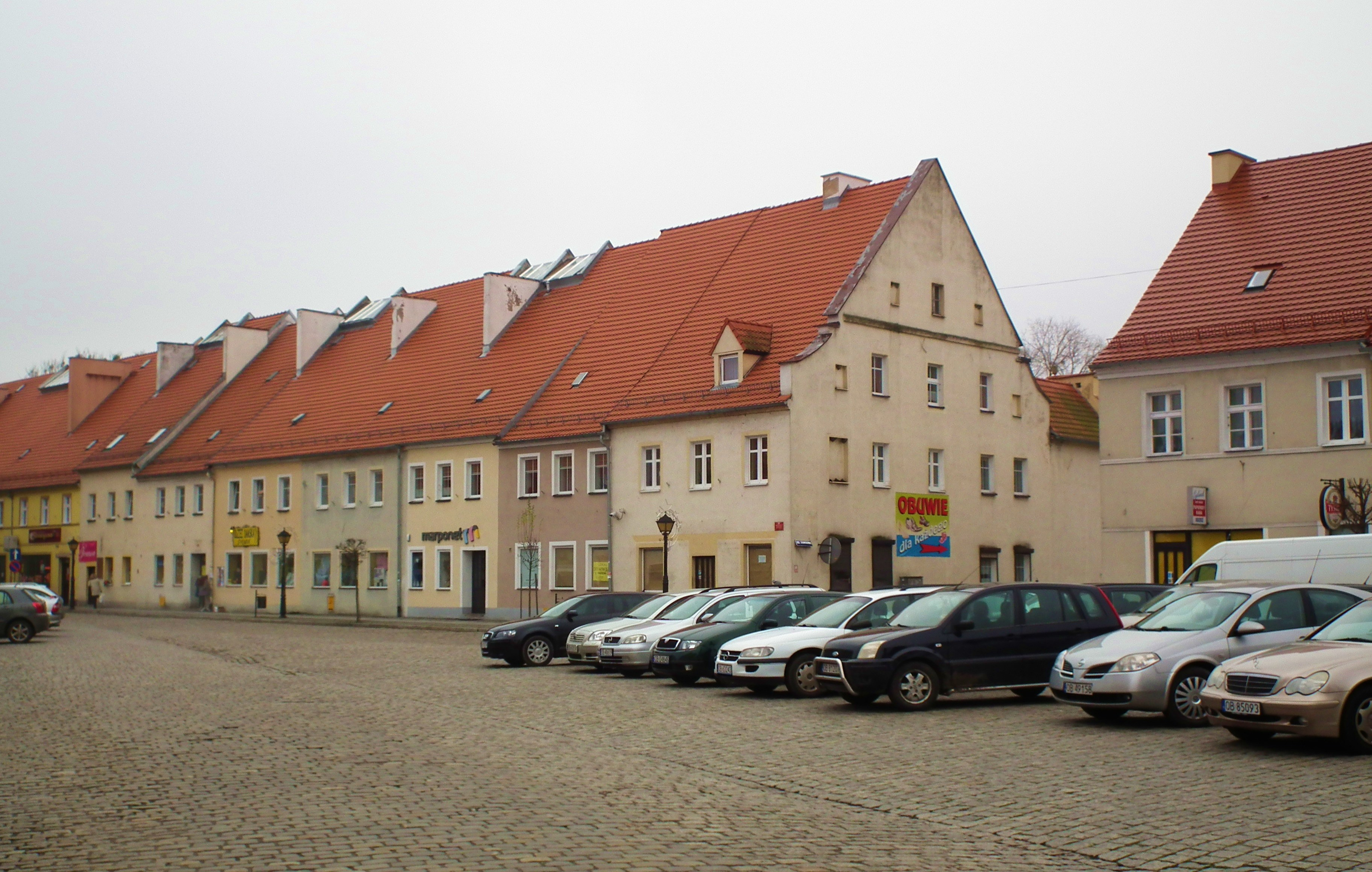
Historical architecture on the Market Square

The 16th century brought an economic boom to the city. Since 1592 yearly fairs were organized with the permission of the duke of Brzeg. After the Reformation the town became mainly Protestant, and the Catholic parish was disbanded. During the Thirty Years' War the town was looted, burned, and struck by the plague. After the dissolution of the Duchy of Legnica in 1675, it was incorporated into the Habsburg monarchy.

In 1742, under the Germanized name Löwen, it became part of Prussia, by then a town of almost 700 people. Several town fires burned the city, the most devastating in 1829, which destroyed the wooden buildings completely and ushered in a fundamental reconstruction of the city. The city was rebuilt with stone buildings, such as the neoclassical Town Hall built in 1837 at the Market Square. In 1846 Löwen was attached to the Upper Silesian Railway, which brought a revival of the industry to the city. In 1866 a metal factory was founded, which produced at first agricultural equipment, then screws, and, much later, finally tape recorders. Other industries included a brick factory, a roof and floor tile factory and a mill. In 1866 the Catholic parish was re-established, though the St. Mary's Church was not built until the early 20th century. Administratively, Löwen was located in Landkreis Brieg, and the seat of its own local court. The old, dilapidated bridge over the Neisse was replaced in 1913 by a new steel bridge.

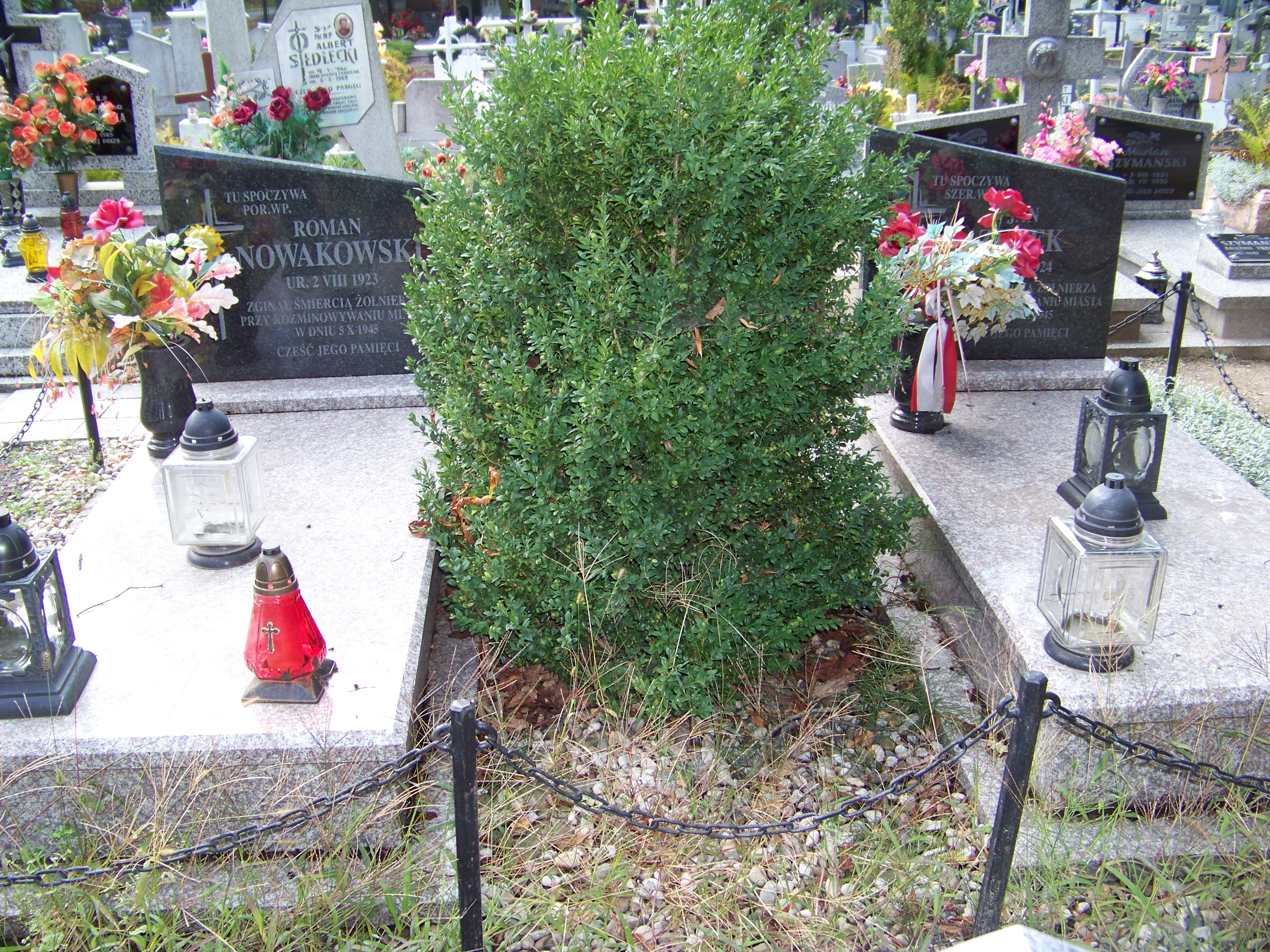
Graves of Polish soldiers killed during demining of the town in 1945

During World War II the Germans brought hundreds of forced labourers to the town, mostly Poles, but also Russians, Ukrainians, the French, Jews and Serbs, both civilians and prisoners of war. In the final stages of World War II, in January 1945, the Germans evacuated most of the population, leaving only the elderly in the town, and recruited many inhabitants into the Volkssturm. On 4 February 1945 the town was overtaken by the Red Army, which plundered it afterwards.

Following the flight and expulsion of Germans during and after World War II, the town was transferred to Polish control and its historic name Lewin was restored, with the adjective Brzeski added after the nearby city of Brzeg. It was repopulated by Poles expelled from former eastern Poland annexed by the Soviet Union, in particular from pre-war southeastern Polish regions of Stanisławów and Lwów. It was first administered as part of Wrocław Voivodeship and in 1950 the city was moved to the Opole Voivodeship, where it has remained despite the administrative reforms of 1999. In the years 1950–1953 a secret anti-communist organization Podziemny Orzeł Wolności ("Underground Eagle of Freedom") operated in the town. Its co-founder, Mieczysław Józefczyk, was awarded the Knight's Cross of the Order of Polonia Restituta, one of the highest Polish decorations, in 2017.

A monument of Pope John Paul II was unveiled in Lewin Brzeski in 2014.

Lewin Brzeski was one of the most affected towns during the 2024 Central European floods, with 90% of the town's area flooded.

== Coat of arms ==
The coat of arms of Lewin was adopted on 18 June 1998 and was based on a seal from the year 1333. It shows a golden lion bordered by three hills on a blue background. The lion recalls the old German name Löwen, which means "lions".

== Demography ==
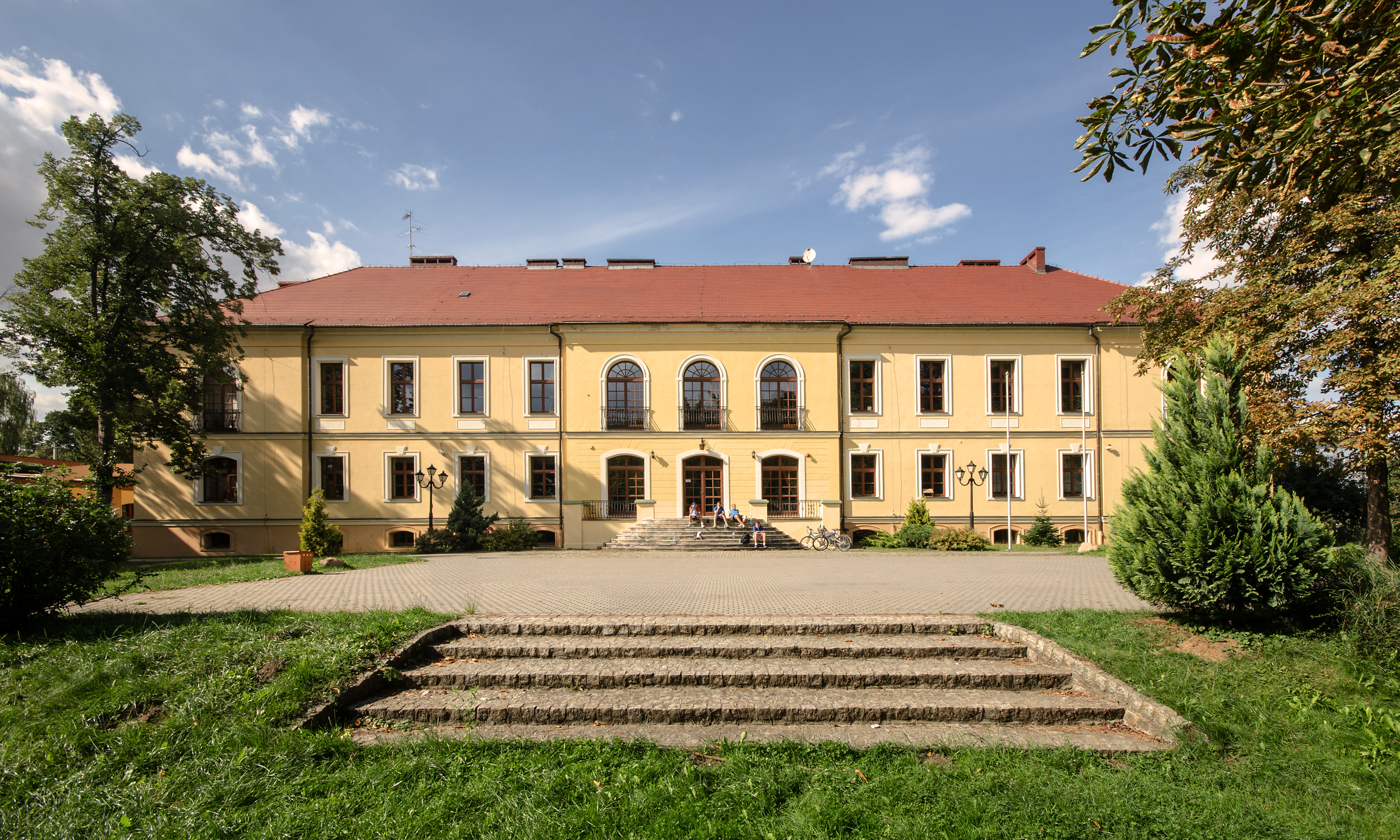
Baroque Leopold's Palace, today a school

Historical population

Year	Pop.	±%
1900	3,245	—
1910	3,514	+8.3%
1925	3,514	+0.0%
1939	3,978	+13.2%

Year	Pop.	±%
1950	3,371	−15.3%
1960	4,197	+24.5%
2010	5,840	+39.1%

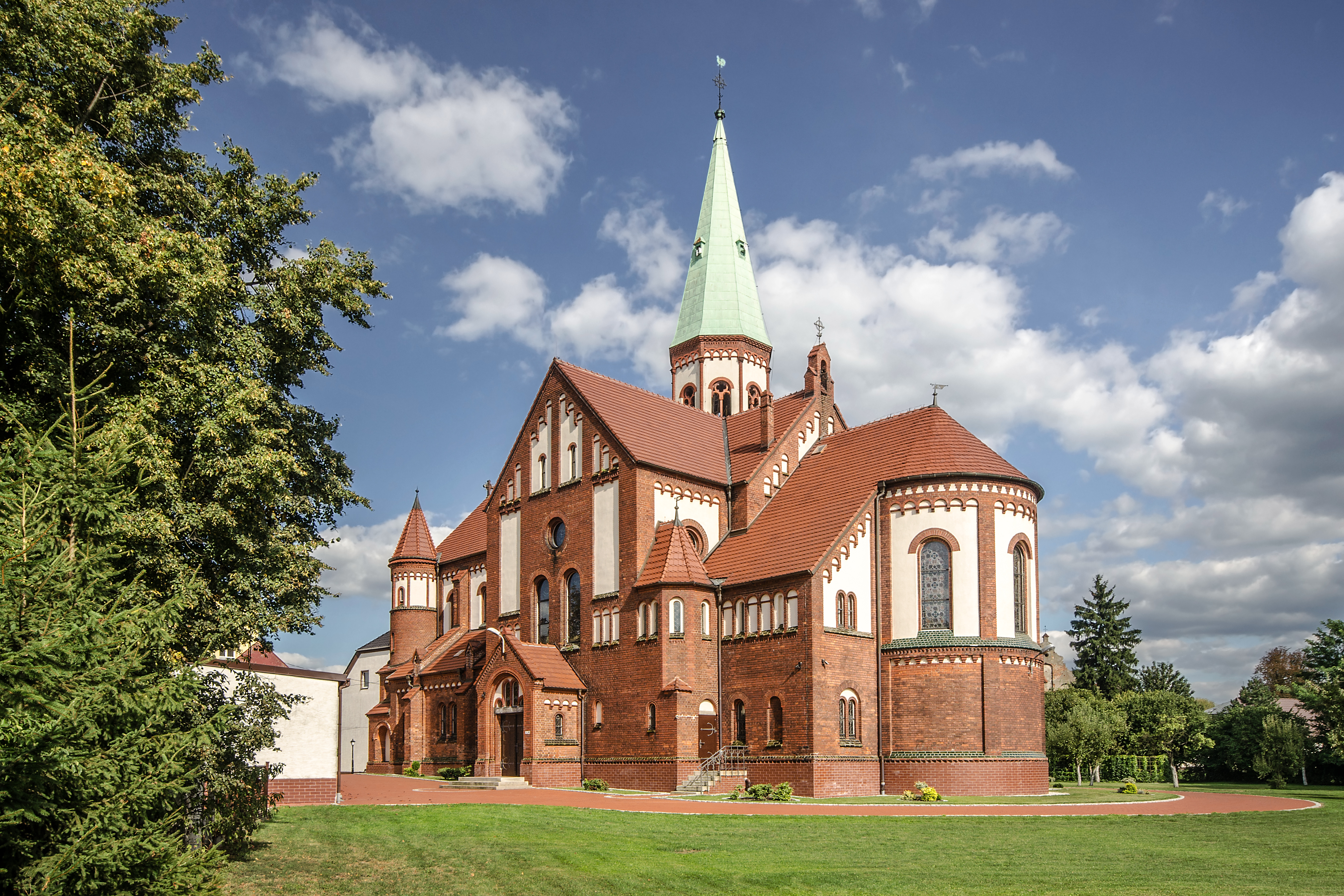
Church of the Assumption

- Population pyramid of the (female to male) population of Lewin Brzeski in 2014:.

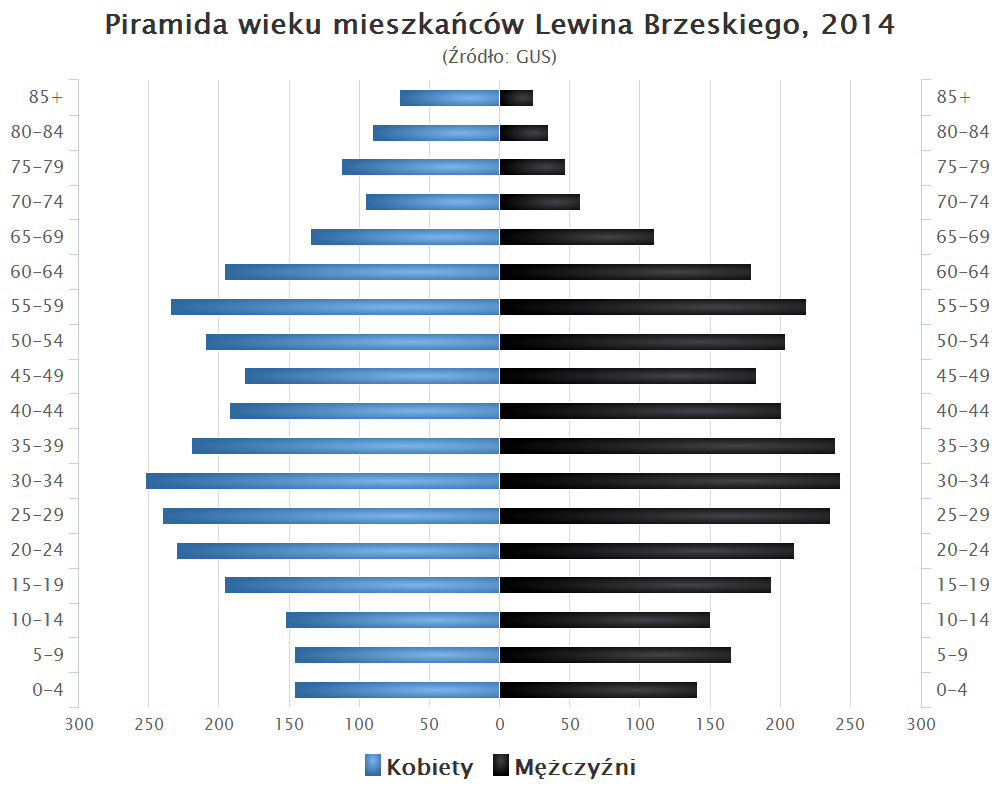

== Economy ==
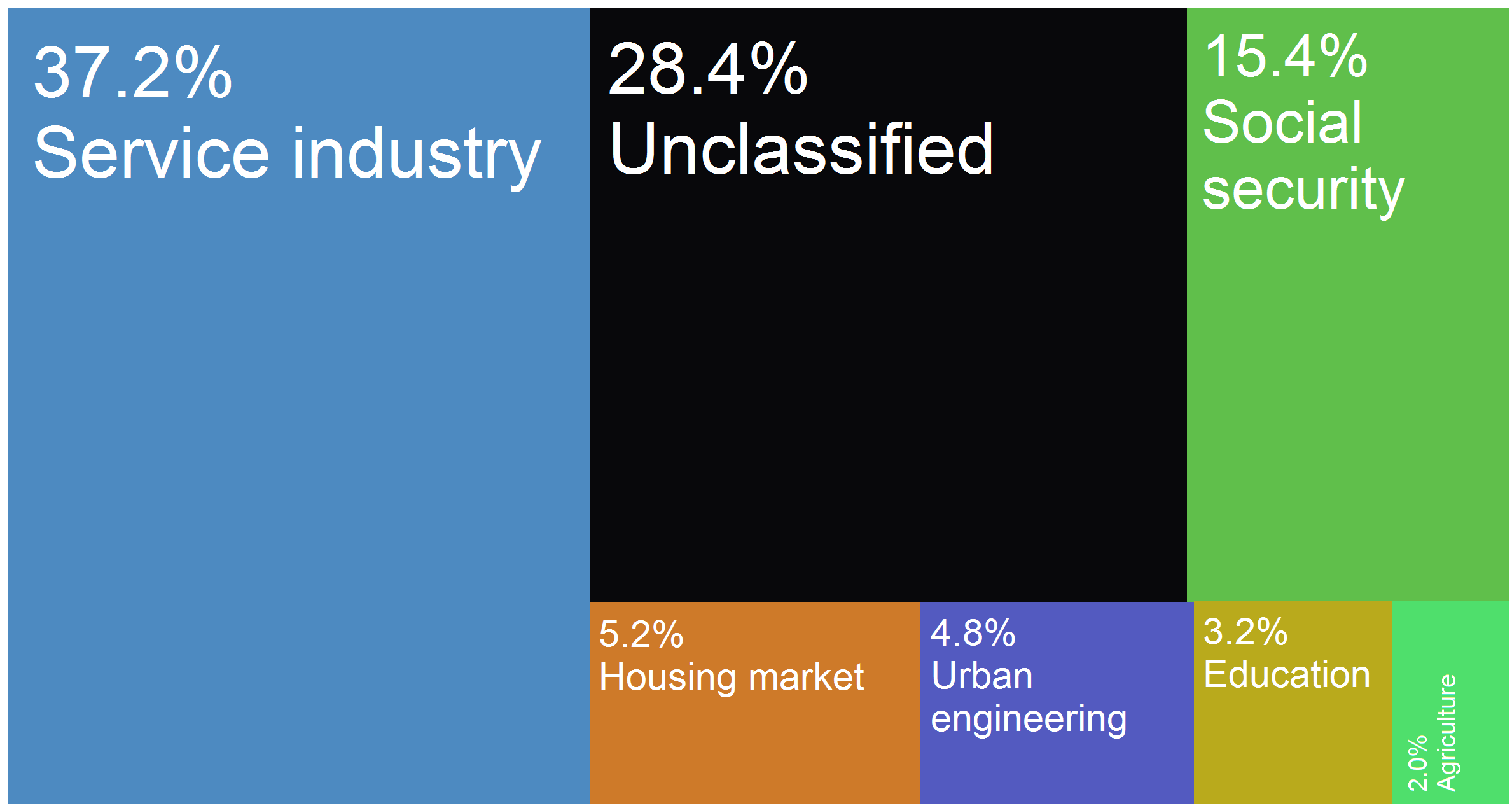
Lewin Brzeski city budget income sources as of 2015.

Lewin Brzeski's economy is in large dependent on the local agricultural sector. The largest industry in the locality is the sugar mill "Wróblin". Surrounding the town there are five former gravel pits, now infilled by water, are a popular attraction for locals and people in the region alike. The town and its vicinity is home to numerous tourist attractions.

== Transport ==
Lewin Brzeski is located on the Voivodeship Road (northbound to Skorogoszcz and the National Road; southbound towards Przylesie, where the road joins the Voivodeship Road, northbound towards Brzeg and southbound towards the A4 Motorway then on). The interchange to the Motorway (Węzeł Przylesie) is located 20 km west of Lewin Brzeski.

Lewin Brzeski lies on the main railway artery between Wrocław and Katowice/Lubliniec, with the town being served by Lewin Brzeski railway station.

== Climate ==
Climate data for Lewin Brzeski (1985–2015)
Month	Jan	Feb	Mar	Apr	May	Jun	Jul	Aug	Sep	Oct	Nov	Dec	Year
Mean daily maximum °C (°F)	2.0 (35.6)	4.0 (39.2)	8.0 (46.4)	15.0 (59.0)	20.0 (68.0)	22.0 (71.6)	25.0 (77.0)	25.0 (77.0)	20.0 (68.0)	15.0 (59.0)	8.0 (46.4)	3.0 (37.4)	12.6 (54.7)
Daily mean °C (°F)	−1.0 (30.2)	1.0 (33.8)	8.0 (46.4)	11.0 (51.8)	12.0 (53.6)	12.0 (53.6)	14.0 (57.2)	14.0 (57.2)	10.0 (50.0)	9.0 (48.2)	6.0 (42.8)	1.0 (33.8)	7.4 (45.3)
Mean daily minimum °C (°F)	−3.0 (26.6)	−3.0 (26.6)	0.0 (32.0)	4.0 (39.2)	8.0 (46.4)	10.0 (50.0)	11.0 (51.8)	11.0 (51.8)	10.0 (50.0)	6.0 (42.8)	2.0 (35.6)	−2.0 (28.4)	5.2 (41.4)
Average precipitation mm (inches)	37 (1.5)	32 (1.3)	40 (1.6)	36 (1.4)	64 (2.5)	59 (2.3)	70 (2.8)	57 (2.2)	44 (1.7)	28 (1.1)	38 (1.5)	37 (1.5)	542 (21.3)
Average precipitation days	14.2	12.8	13.5	11.2	13.4	14.5	14.1	12.0	10.4	8.8	11.4	13.8	150.1
Source: meteoblue.com

== Notable people ==
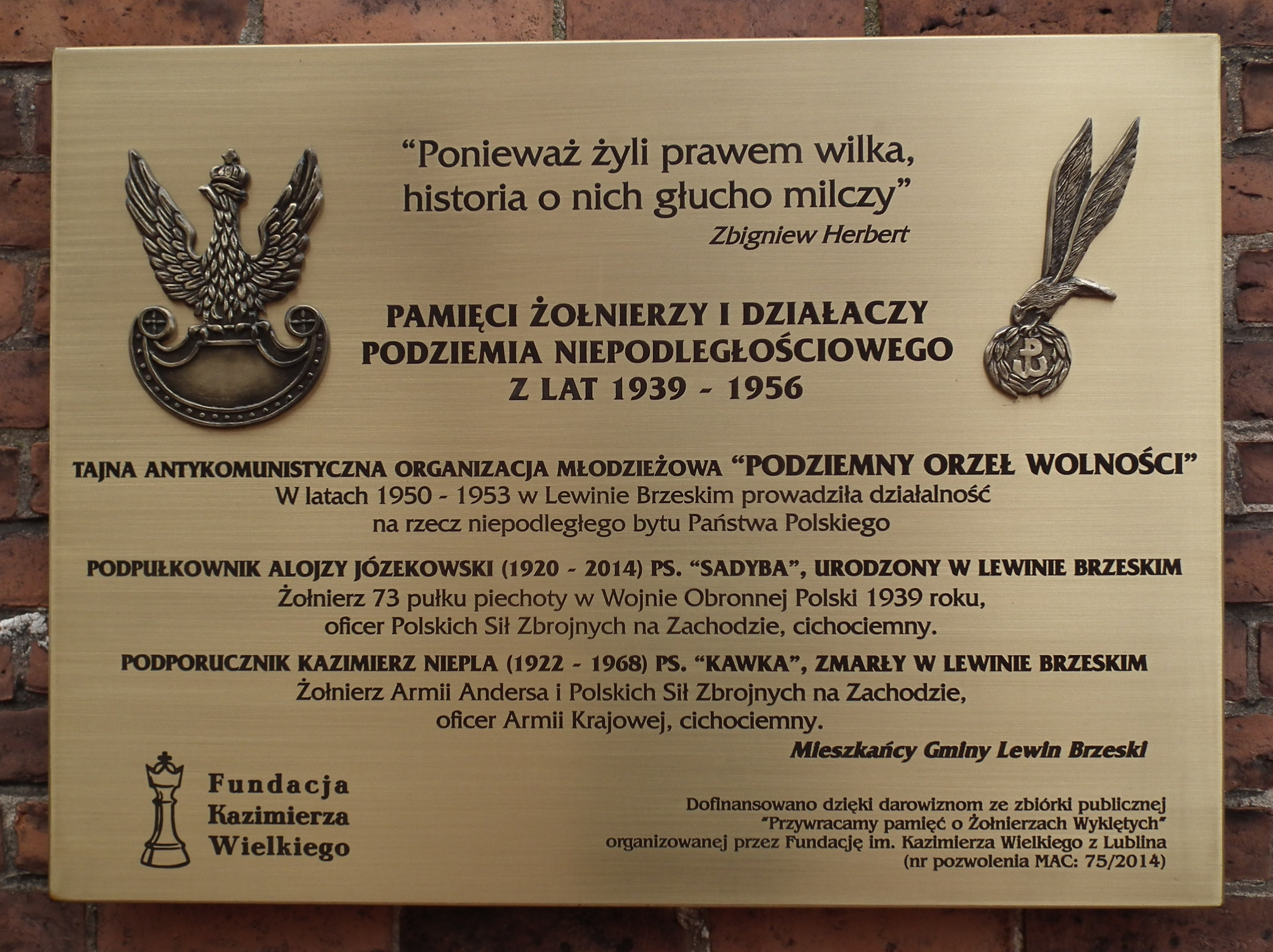
Memorial plaque to Polish officers Alojzy Józekowski and Kazimierz Niepla and other heroes of Polish independence struggles of 1939–1956

- Carl von Plotho (1780–1820), Prussian Lieutenant colonel and military historian.
- Gustav Hellmann (1854–1939), German meteorologist.
- Alojzy Józekowski (1920–2014), Polish Lieutenant colonel, participant in the 1939 defensive war
- Kazimierz Niepla (1922–1968), Polish military officer, member of the Home Army and cichociemni
- Bogdan Harańczyk (born 1947), former Polish footballer

== Twin towns – sister cities ==
See twin towns of Gmina Lewin Brzeski.

== See also ==
- Flag of Lewin Brzeski
