= Gustav Hellmann =

German meteorologist (1854–1939)

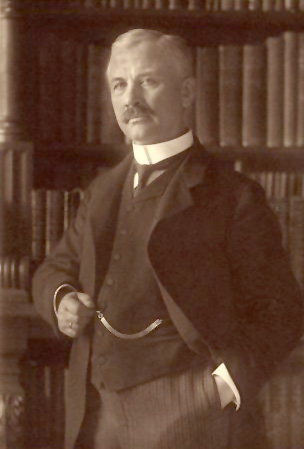
- Born: 3 July 1854; Lewin Brzeski (Kingdom of Prussia)
- Died: 21 February 1939 (aged 84); Berlin (German Reich)
- Alma mater: University of Göttingen
- Occupation: Meteorologist, university teacher
- Employer: Humboldt University of Berlin

Gustav Johann Georg Hellmann or Georg Gustav Hellmann (3 July 1854 – 21 February 1939) was a German meteorologist.

Hellmann was born in Löwen (Lewin Brzeski), Prussian Silesia. Since 1907 to 1922, he was the principal of the Preußischen Meteorologischen Institut (Prussian Meteorological Institute) in Berlin. He died in Berlin.

== Works ==
- An editor of the "Meteorologische Zeitschrift" 1892-1907 (with Julius von Hann)
- Repertorium der Deutschen Meteorologie, 1883
- Gustav Hellmann (1893). Schneekrystalle: Beobachtungen und Studien. Verlag von Rudolph Mückenberger.

=== Work with snowflakes ===
In 1892 Hellmann piqued an interest in pictures of snowflakes, after seeing some of Wilson Bentley's photography, he commissioned a microphotographer to take shots of snowflakes to study. Upon review of these microphotographs, Hellmann noted a large difference in the snowflake pictures he took, and the ones Wilson Bentley had taken. Hellmann's snowflakes were irregular, there were various types, sizes, shapes, and forms. Bentley's snowflakes however, were perfect, symmetrical, six-sided and reminiscent of stars. Hellmann was perplexed by this, and openly questioned the accuracy of Bentley's work. He accused Bentley of manipulating the snowflake to get these perfect results. Bentley eventually admitted to somewhat doctoring the photographs, by scraping emulsion off the negatives, but he claimed that this did not change the integrity or accuracy of the photograph. This argument persisted for years, Hellmann insisted that altering the snowflake was unethical, as it misrepresented the snowflake in its truest form, Bentley argued the opposite. Although the argument never formally ended with one side winning, it is still Bentley's snowflake the world thinks of when they see snow fall.

=== Hellmann number ===
In Germany and especially the Netherlands, Hellmann is known for the Hellmann number, a measure for the severity of a winter. This figure is derived by adding up all negative temperatures in the period of 1 November of the previous year up to and including 31 March of the current year.

== See also ==
- Wind gradient
