= Flag of Lewin Brzeski =

Polish municipal flag

Lewin Brzeski
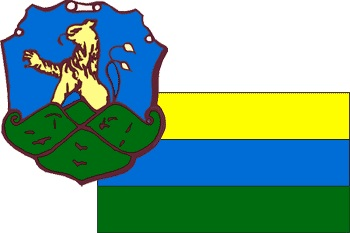
- Flag of Lewin Brzeski
- Proportion: 5:8
- Adopted: 1333 (coat of arms)
- Design: A tri-colour with yellow, blue and green colours; with a shield in the top-left of the flag

The flag of Lewin Brzeski is the flag of the town of Lewin Brzeski, Opole Voivodeship, in Poland. The flag is arranged in a tri-colour of: yellow, blue and green; with a shield, presenting the coat of arms of Lewin Brzeski in the top-left corner of the flag.

== Coat of arms ==
The coat of arms of Lewin Brzeski was first recorded on a seal from the year of 1333. The main element of the shield is a golden half-lion, standing upwards, with two tails; appearing out of three green hills. The coat of arms has relations to the German name for the town - Löwen (Löwe meaning Lion). The coat of arms was officially approved on June 18, 1998, in the statute of the Lewin Brzeski Gmina.

The officially used coat of arms of Lewin Brzeski is primitive as it originated from a seal from 1333. A more accurate design of the coat of arms was suggested in the book Herbarzu miast polskich (Peerage of Polish Settlements) by Plewak and Wanaga.
