= Lewin Brzeski Town Hall =

Ratusz w Lewinie Brzeskim (Lewin Brzeski Town Hall)
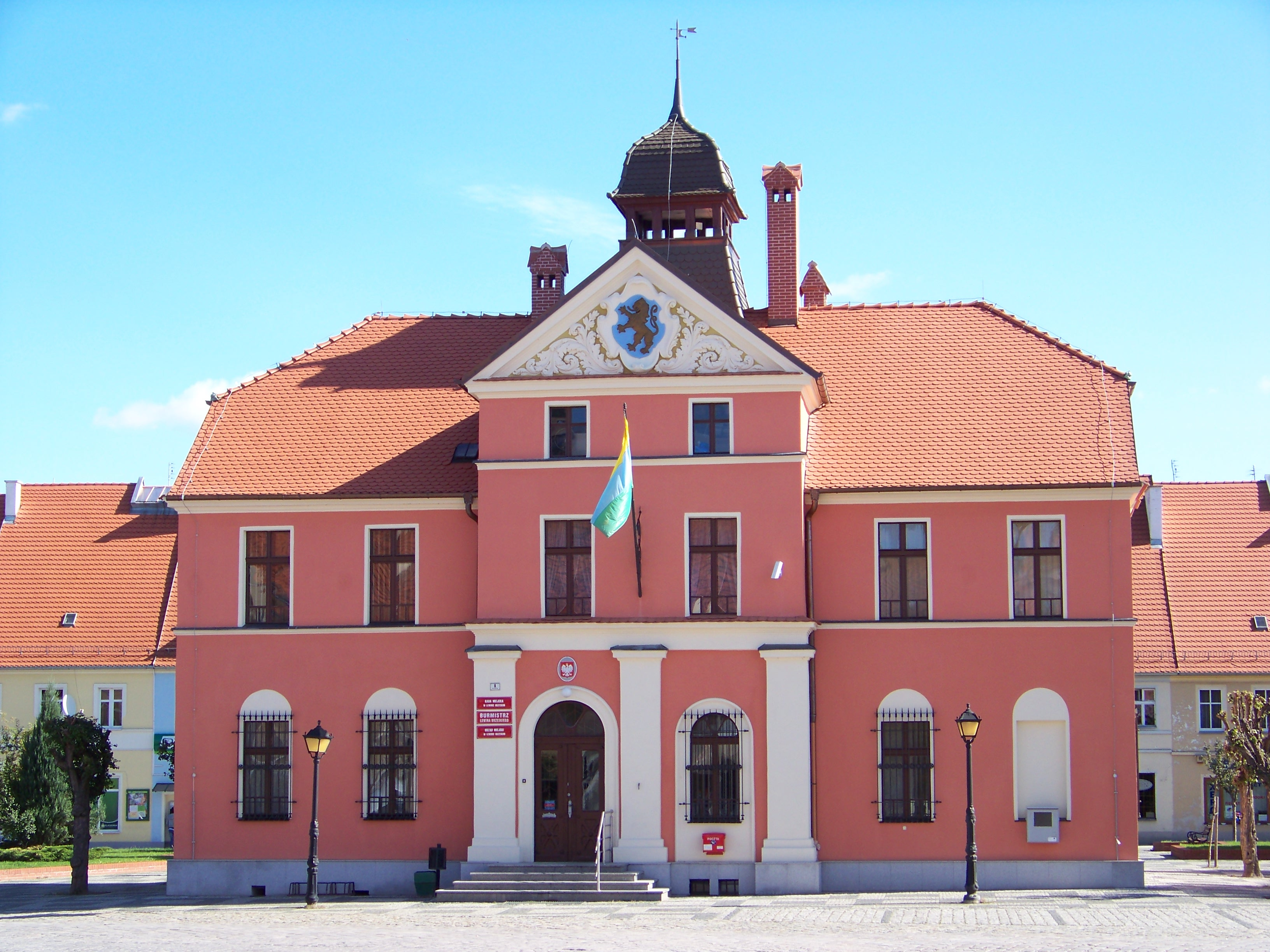
- Lewin Brzeski Town Hall
- Interactive map of the Ratusz w Lewinie Brzeskim (Lewin Brzeski Town Hall) area

General information
- Type: Town hall
- Architectural style: Classicism
- Location: Lewin Brzeski, Poland
- Coordinates: 50.7483°N 17.6164°E
- Completed: 1838

Lewin Brzeski Town Hall - a town hall built in the Classical architectural style in 1838. the building is located in the middle of the Lewin Brzeski Market Square (Rynek), the town hall is currently the seat of the Lewin Brzeski City Council and Gmina Lewin Brzeski authorities.

== History ==
The first town hall in Lewin Brzeski was raised at the beginning of the sixteenth-century. The former town hall was built with a wattle and daub structure, the non-renovated building was damaged in 1799. The current town hall was built in 1838, and remains in its original form.

== Gallery ==
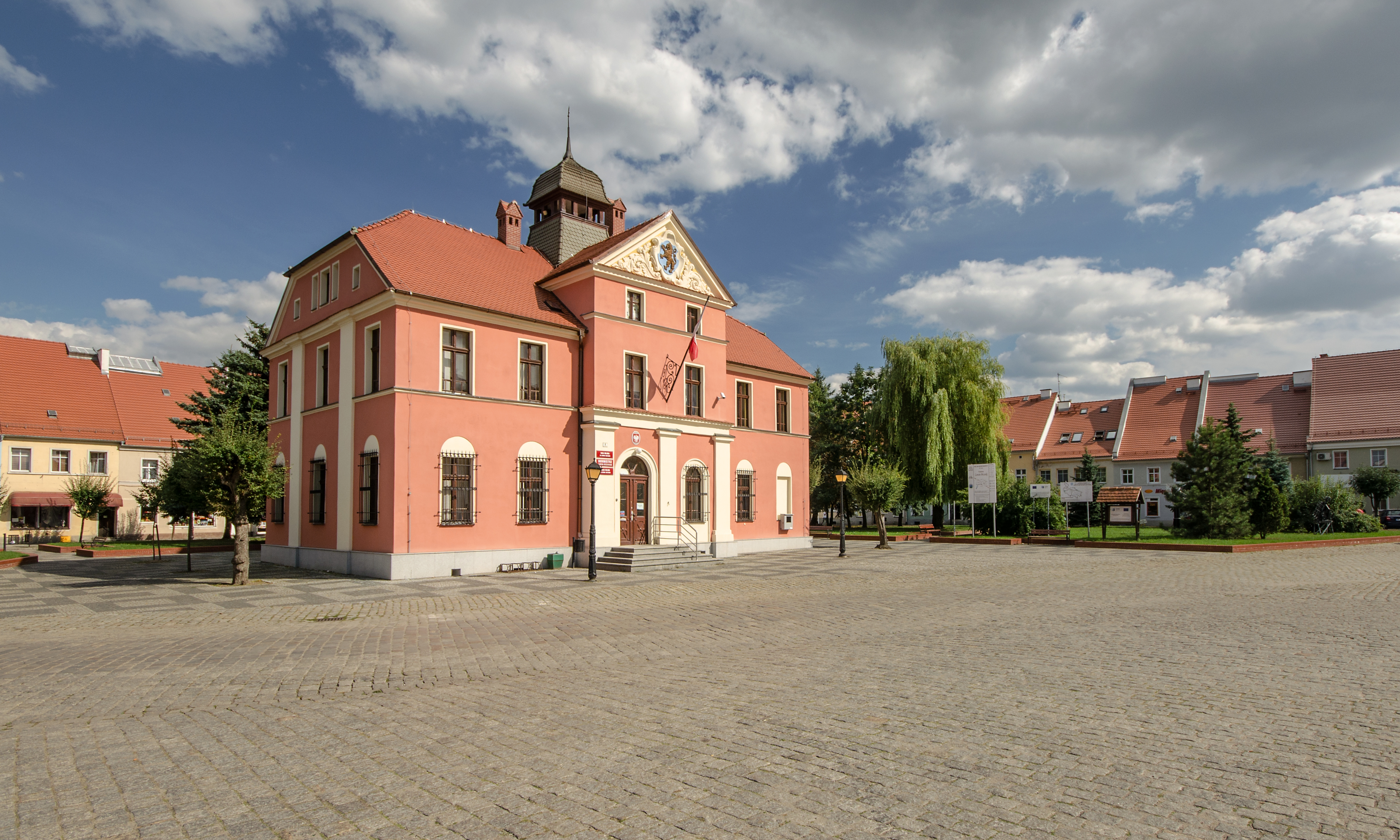
The Lewin Brzeski Town Hall seen from the north-west of the Market Square.

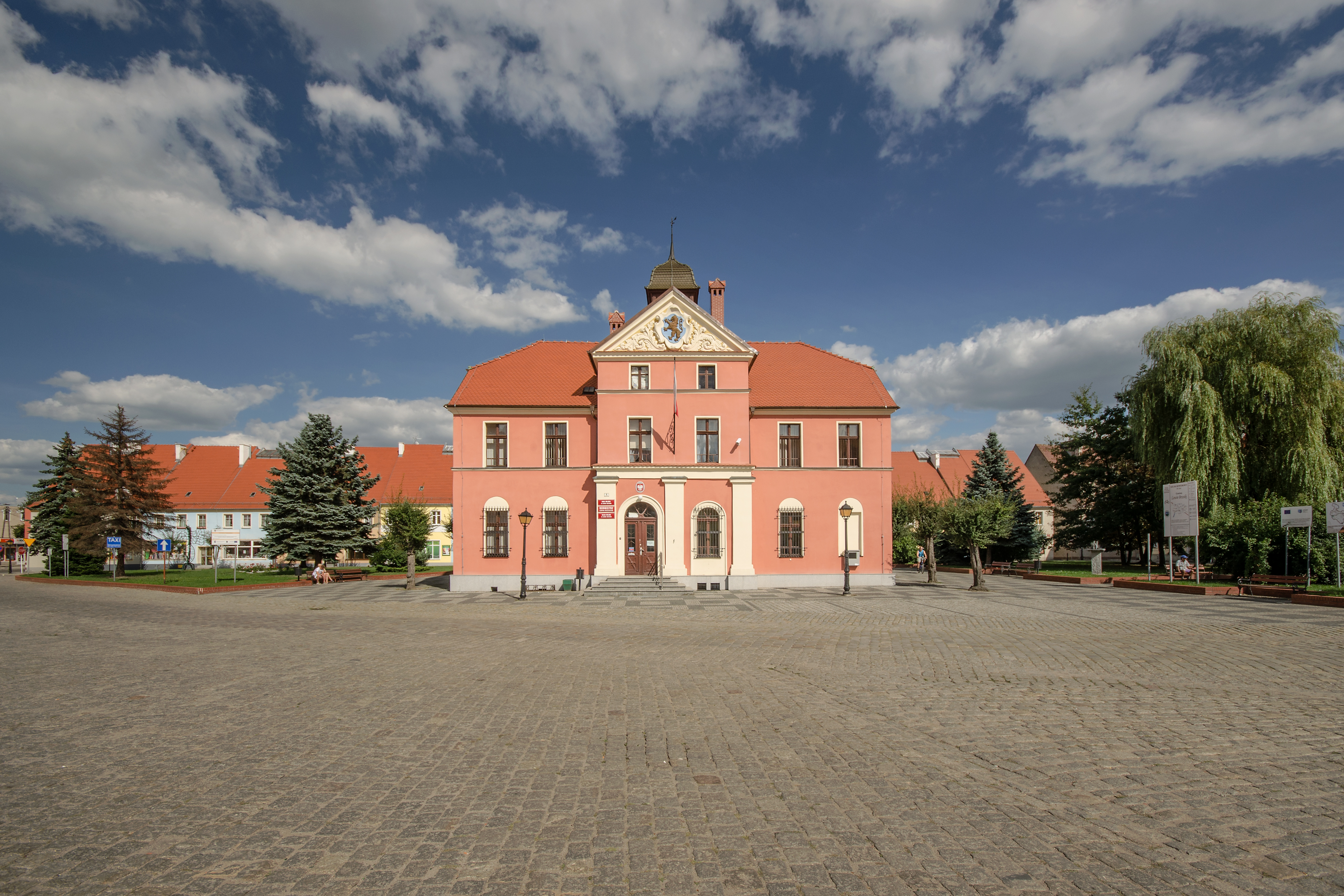
The Lewin Brzeski Town Hall seen west from the Market Square, surrounded by the Planty.

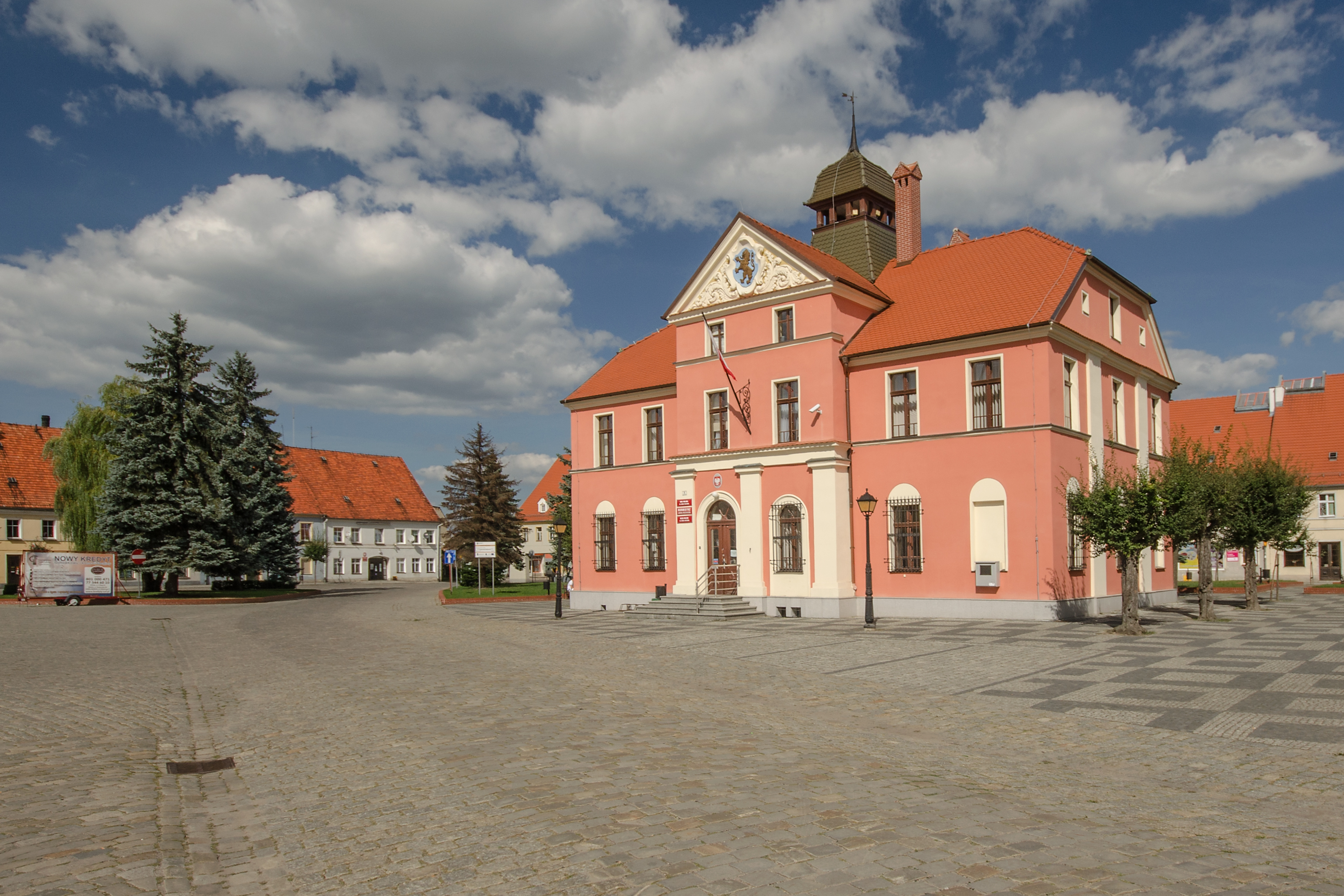
The Lewin Brzeski Town Hall seen from the south-west of the Market Square.
