= Refraction =

Physical phenomenon relating to the direction of waves

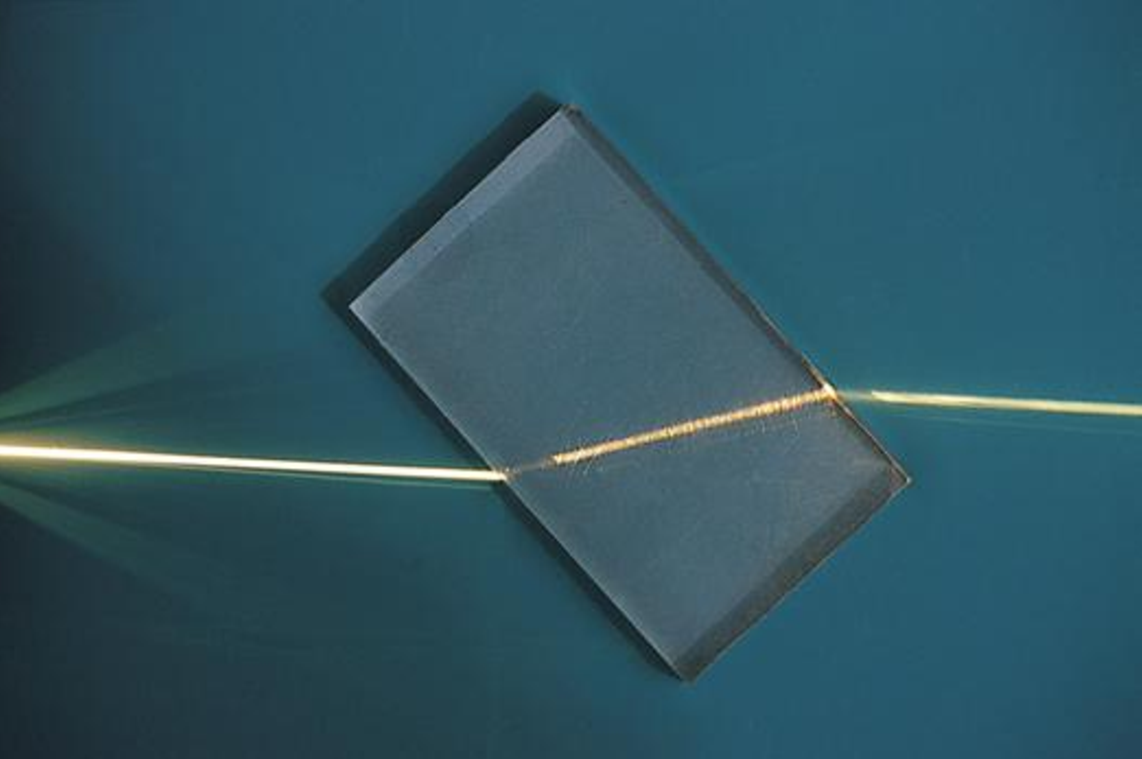
A ray of light being refracted in a plastic block

In physics, refraction is the redirection of a wave as it passes from one medium to another. The redirection can be caused by the wave's change in speed or by a change in the medium. Refraction of light is the most commonly observed phenomenon, but other waves such as sound waves and water waves also experience refraction. How much a wave is refracted is determined by the change in wave speed and the initial direction of wave propagation relative to the direction of change in speed.

Optical prisms and lenses use refraction to redirect light, as does the human eye. The refractive index of materials varies with the wavelength of light, and thus the angle of the refraction also varies correspondingly. This is called dispersion and allows certain prisms and raindrops in rainbows to divide white light into its constituent spectral colors.

== Law ==
Refraction of light at the interface between two media of different refractive indices, with n_{2} > n_{1}. Since the phase velocity is lower in the second medium (v_{2} < v_{1}), the angle of refraction θ_{2} is less than the angle of incidence θ_{1}; that is, the ray in the higher-index medium is closer to the normal.

For light, refraction follows Snell's law, which states that, for a given pair of media, the ratio of the sines of the angle of incidence ${\theta_1}$ and angle of refraction ${\theta_2}$ is equal to the ratio of phase velocities $\frac{v_1}{v_2}$ in the two media, or equivalently, to the refractive indices $\frac{n_2}{n_1}$ of the two media:

$$\frac{\sin\theta_1}{\sin\theta_2} =\frac{v_1}{v_2}=\frac{n_2}{n_1}$$

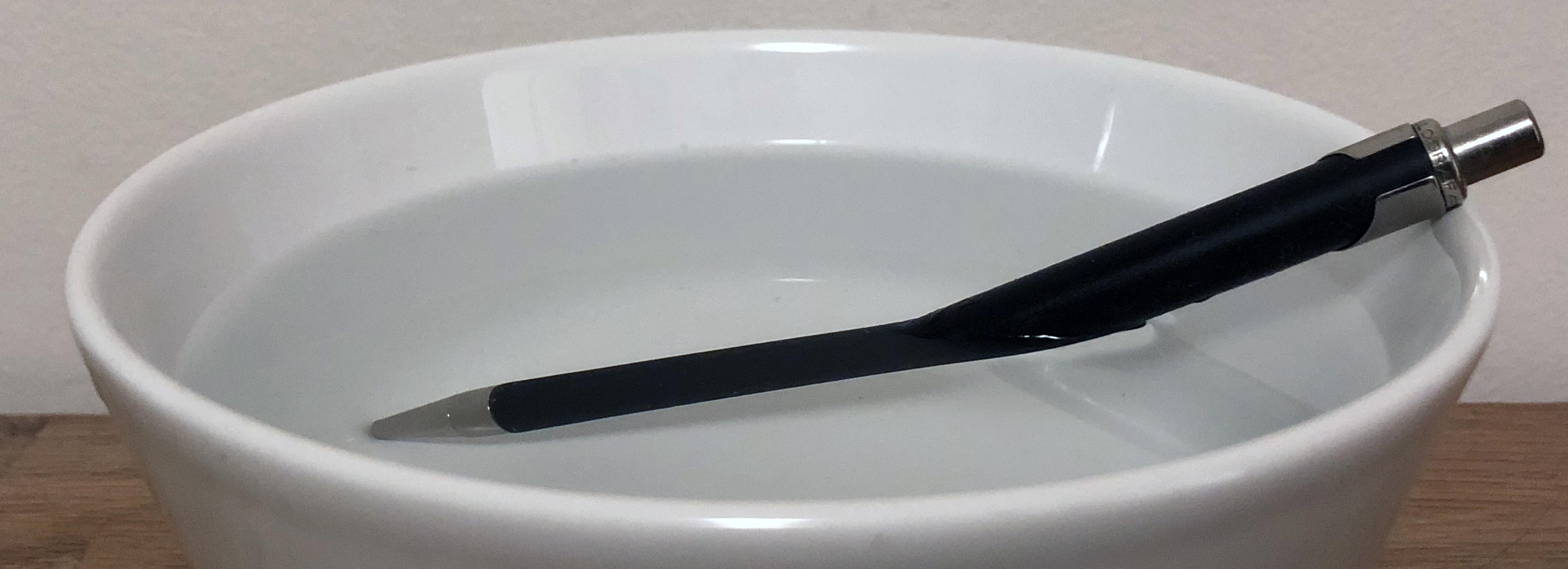
A pen partially submerged in a bowl of water appears bent due to refraction at the water surface.

== General explanation ==
When a wave moves into a slower medium the wavefronts get compressed. For the wavefronts to stay connected at the boundary the wave must change direction.

Refraction involves two related parts, both a result of the wave nature of light: a reduced speed in an optical medium and a change in angle when a wave front crosses between different media at an angle.

1. Light slows as it travels through a medium other than vacuum (such as air, glass or water). This is not because of scattering or absorption. Rather it is because, as an electromagnetic oscillation, light itself causes other electrically charged particles such as electrons, to oscillate. The oscillating electrons emit their own electromagnetic waves which interact with the original light. The resulting combined wave has a lower speed. When light returns to a vacuum and there are no electrons nearby, this slowing effect ends and its speed returns to c.
2. When light enters a slower medium at an angle, one side of the wavefront is slowed before the other. This asymmetrical slowing of the light causes it to change the angle of its travel. Once light is within the new medium with constant properties, it travels in a straight line again.

=== Slowing of light ===
As described above, the speed of light is slower in a medium other than vacuum. This slowing applies to any medium such as air, water, or glass, and is responsible for phenomena such as refraction. On the other side of the medium its speed will again be the speed of light in vacuum, c.

A correct explanation rests on light's nature as an electromagnetic wave. Because light is an oscillating electrical/magnetic wave, light traveling in a medium causes the electrically charged electrons of the material to also oscillate. (The material's protons also oscillate but as they are around 2000 times more massive, their movement and therefore their effect, is far smaller). A moving electrical charge emits electromagnetic waves of its own. The electromagnetic waves emitted by the oscillating electrons interact with the electromagnetic waves that make up the original light, similar to water waves on a pond, a process known as constructive interference. When two waves interfere in this way, the resulting "combined" wave may have wave packets that pass an observer at a slower rate. The light has effectively been slowed. When the light leaves the material, this interaction with electrons no longer happens, and therefore the wave packet rate (and therefore its speed) return to normal.

=== Bending of light ===
Consider a wave going from one material to another where its speed is slower as in the figure. If it reaches the interface between the materials at an angle one side of the wave will reach the second material first, and therefore slow down earlier. With one side of the wave going slower the whole wave will pivot towards that side. This is why a wave will bend away from the surface or toward the normal when going into a slower material. In the opposite case of a wave reaching a material where the speed is higher, one side of the wave will speed up and the wave will pivot away from that side.

Another way of understanding the same thing is to consider the change in wavelength at the interface. When the wave goes from one material to another where the wave has a different speed v, the frequency f of the wave will stay the same, but the distance between wavefronts or wavelength λ = v/f will change. If the speed is decreased, such as in the figure to the right, the wavelength will also decrease. With an angle between the wave fronts and the interface and change in distance between the wave fronts the angle must change over the interface to keep the wave fronts intact. From these considerations the relationship between the angle of incidence θ_{1}, angle of transmission θ_{2} and the wave speeds v_{1} and v_{2} in the two materials can be derived. This is the law of refraction or Snell's law and can be written as

$$\frac{\sin\theta_1}{\sin\theta_2} = \frac{v_1}{v_2} \,.$$

The phenomenon of refraction can in a more fundamental way be derived from the 2 or 3-dimensional wave equation. The boundary condition at the interface will then require the tangential component of the wave vector to be identical on the two sides of the interface. Since the magnitude of the wave vector depend on the wave speed this requires a change in direction of the wave vector.

The relevant wave speed in the discussion above is the phase velocity of the wave. This is typically close to the group velocity which can be seen as the truer speed of a wave, but when they differ it is important to use the phase velocity in all calculations relating to refraction.

A wave traveling perpendicular to a boundary, i.e. having its wavefronts parallel to the boundary, will not change direction even if the speed of the wave changes.

=== Dispersion of light ===
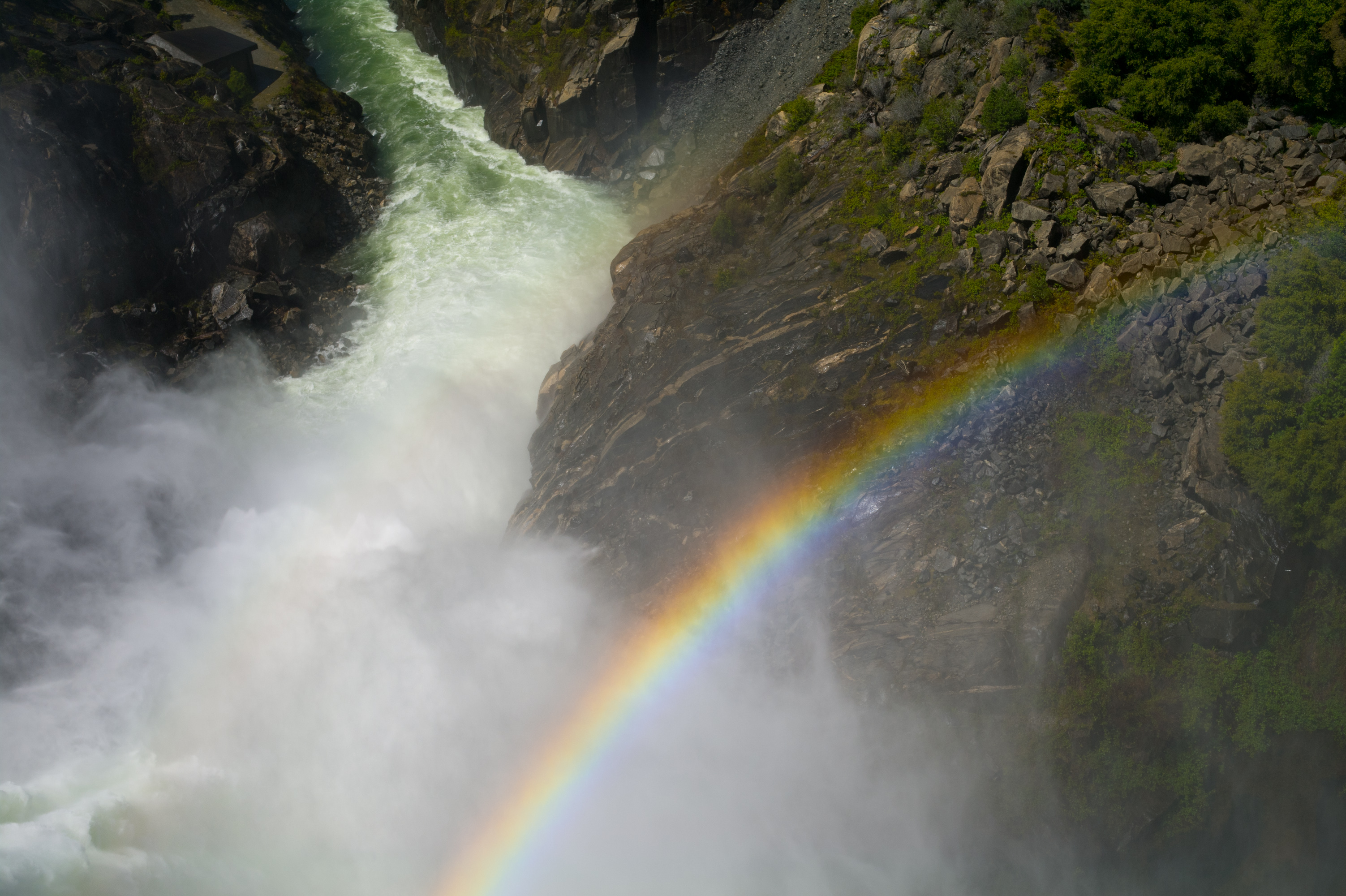
Rainbows are formed by dispersion of light, in which the refraction angle depends on the light's frequency.

Refraction is also responsible for rainbows and for the splitting of white light into a rainbow-spectrum as it passes through a glass prism. Glass and water have higher refractive indices than air. When a beam of white light passes from air into a material having an index of refraction that varies with frequency (and wavelength), a phenomenon known as dispersion occurs, in which different coloured components of the white light are refracted at different angles, i.e., they bend by different amounts at the interface, so that they become separated. The different colors correspond to different frequencies and different wavelengths.

== On water ==
A pencil part immersed in water looks bent due to refraction: the light waves from X change direction and so seem to originate at Y.

Refraction occurs when light goes through a water surface since water has a refractive index of 1.33 and air has a refractive index of about 1. Looking at a straight object, such as a pencil in the figure here, which is placed at a slant, partially in the water, the object appears to bend at the water's surface. This is due to the bending of light rays as they move from the water to the air. Once the rays reach the eye, the eye traces them back as straight lines (lines of sight). The lines of sight (shown as dashed lines) intersect at a higher position than where the actual rays originated. This causes the pencil to appear higher and the water to appear shallower than it really is.

The depth that the water appears to be when viewed from above is known as the apparent depth. This is an important consideration for spearfishing from the surface because it will make the target fish appear to be in a different place, and the fisher must aim lower to catch the fish. Conversely, an object above the water has a higher apparent height when viewed from below the water. The opposite correction must be made by an archer fish.

For small angles of incidence (measured from the normal, when sin θ is approximately the same as tan θ), the ratio of apparent to real depth is the ratio of the refractive index of air to that of water. But, as the angle of incidence approaches 90°, the apparent depth approaches zero, albeit reflection increases, which limits observation at high angles of incidence. Conversely, the apparent height approaches infinity as the angle of incidence (from below) increases, but even earlier, as the angle of total internal reflection is approached, albeit the image also fades from view as this limit is approached.

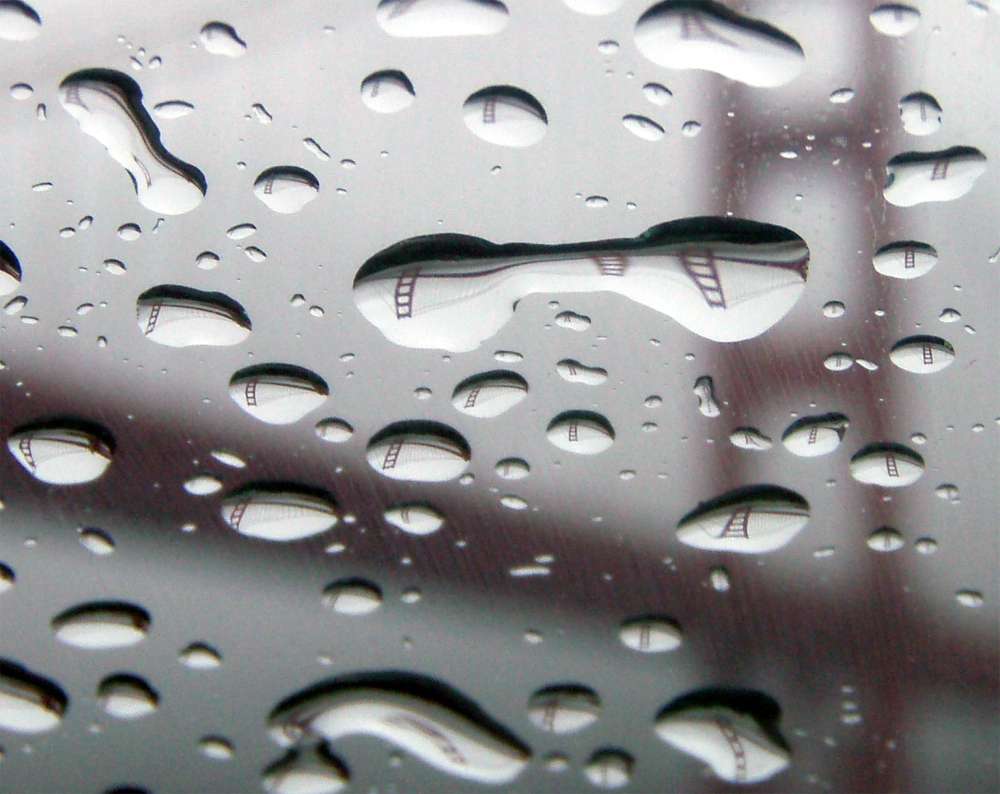
An image of the Golden Gate Bridge is refracted and bent by many differing three-dimensional drops of water.

== Atmospheric ==
Comparison of inferior and superior mirages due to differing air refractive indices, n

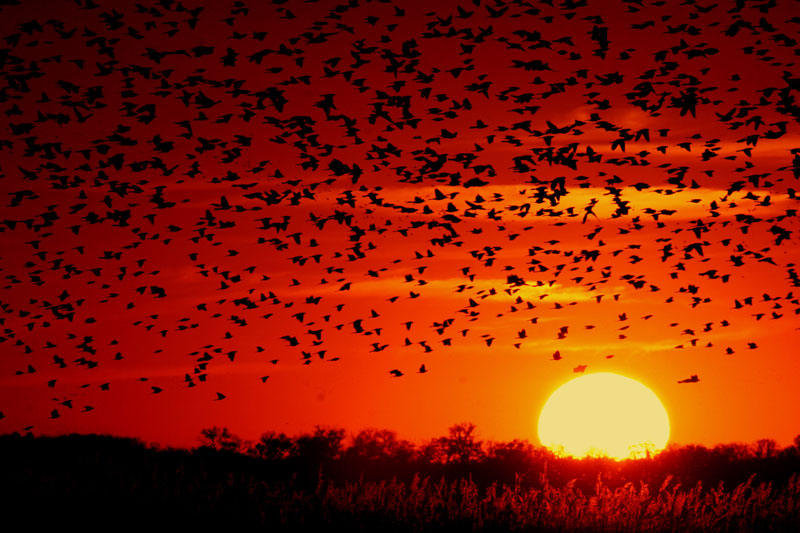
The sun appears slightly flattened when close to the horizon due to refraction in the atmosphere.

The refractive index of air depends on the air density and thus vary with air temperature and pressure. Since the pressure is lower at higher altitudes, the refractive index is also lower, causing light rays to refract towards the earth surface when traveling long distances through the atmosphere. This shifts the apparent positions of stars slightly when they are close to the horizon and makes the sun visible before it geometrically rises above the horizon during a sunrise.

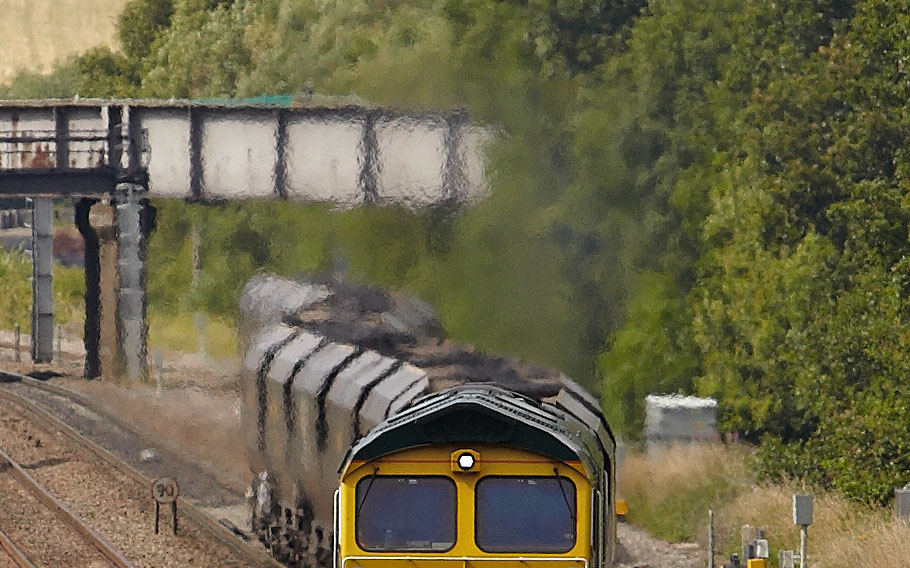
Heat haze in the engine exhaust above a diesel locomotive

Temperature variations in the air can also cause refraction of light. This can be seen as a heat haze when hot and cold air is mixed e.g. over a fire, in engine exhaust, or when opening a window on a cold day. This makes objects viewed through the mixed air appear to shimmer or move around randomly as the hot and cold air moves. This effect is also visible from normal variations in air temperature during a sunny day when using high magnification telephoto lenses and is often limiting the image quality in these cases. In a similar way, atmospheric turbulence gives rapidly varying distortions in the images of astronomical telescopes limiting the resolution of terrestrial telescopes not using adaptive optics or other techniques for overcoming these atmospheric distortions.

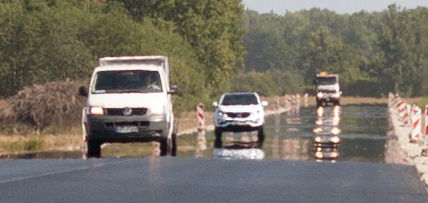
Mirage over a hot road

Air temperature variations close to the surface can give rise to other optical phenomena, such as mirages and Fata Morgana. Most commonly, air heated by a hot road on a sunny day deflects light approaching at a shallow angle towards a viewer. This makes the road appear reflecting, giving an illusion of water covering the road.

== In eye care ==
In medicine, particularly optometry, ophthalmology and orthoptics, refraction (also known as refractometry) is a clinical test in which a phoropter may be used by the appropriate eye care professional to determine the eye's refractive error and the best corrective lenses to be prescribed. A series of test lenses in graded optical powers or focal lengths are presented to determine which provides the sharpest, clearest vision. Refractive surgery is a medical procedure to treat common vision disorders.

== Mechanical waves ==
=== Water ===
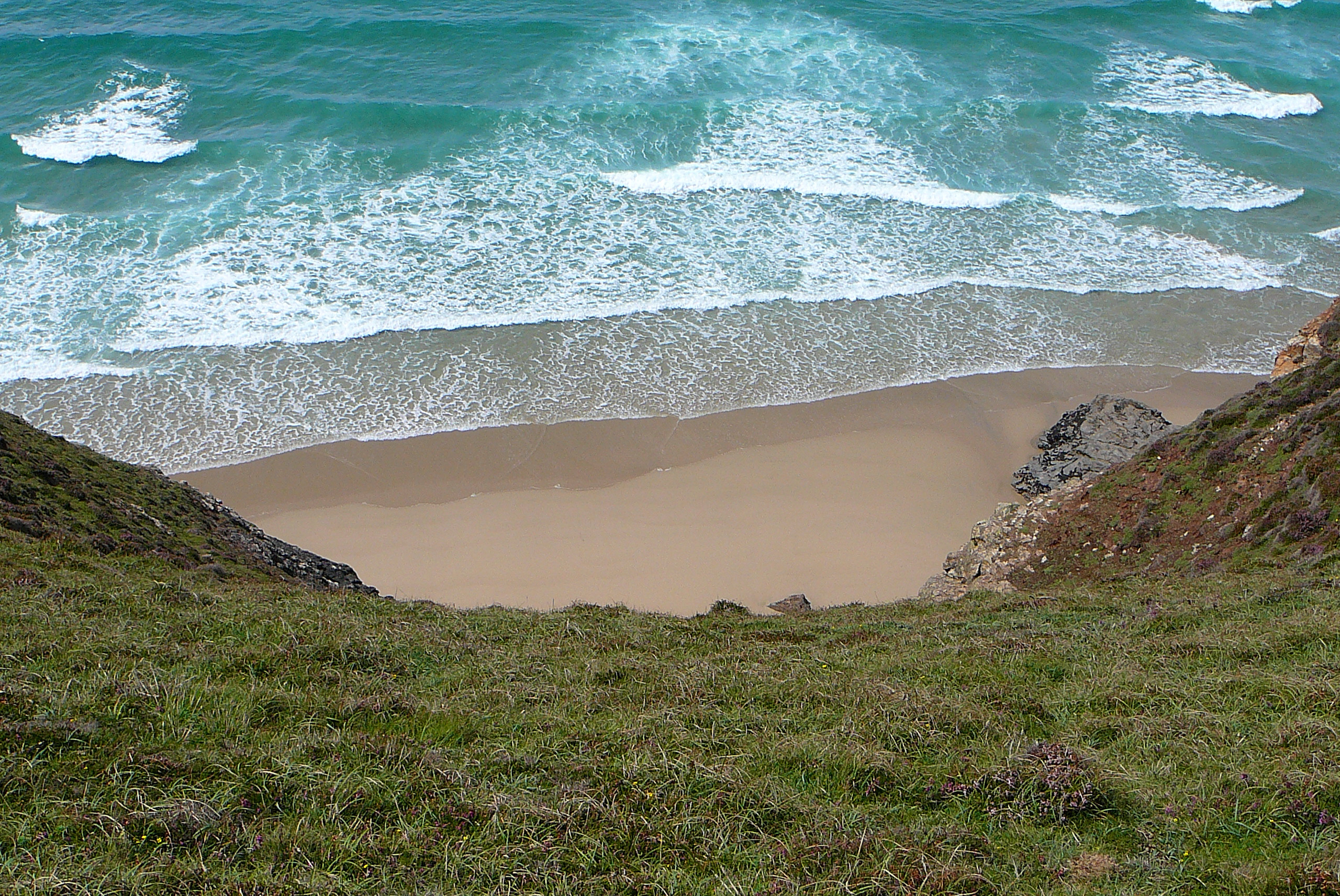
Water waves are almost parallel to the beach when they hit it because they gradually refract towards land as the water gets shallower.

Water waves travel slower in shallower water. This can be used to demonstrate refraction in ripple tanks and also explains why waves on a shoreline tend to strike the shore close to a perpendicular angle. As the waves travel from deep water into shallower water near the shore, they are refracted from their original direction of travel to an angle more normal to the shoreline.

=== Sound ===
In underwater acoustics, refraction is the bending or curving of a sound ray that results when the ray passes through a sound speed gradient from a region of one sound speed to a region of a different speed. The amount of ray bending is dependent on the amount of difference between sound speeds, that is, the variation in temperature, salinity, and pressure of the water. Similar acoustics effects are also found in the Earth's atmosphere. The phenomenon of refraction of sound in the atmosphere has been known for centuries. Beginning in the early 1970s, widespread analysis of this effect came into vogue through the designing of urban highways and noise barriers to address the meteorological effects of bending of sound rays in the lower atmosphere.

== Gallery ==
2D simulation: refraction of a wave packet from a potential step. The black half of the background is zero potential, the gray half is a higher potential. White blur represents the probability distribution of finding a particle in a given place if measured.

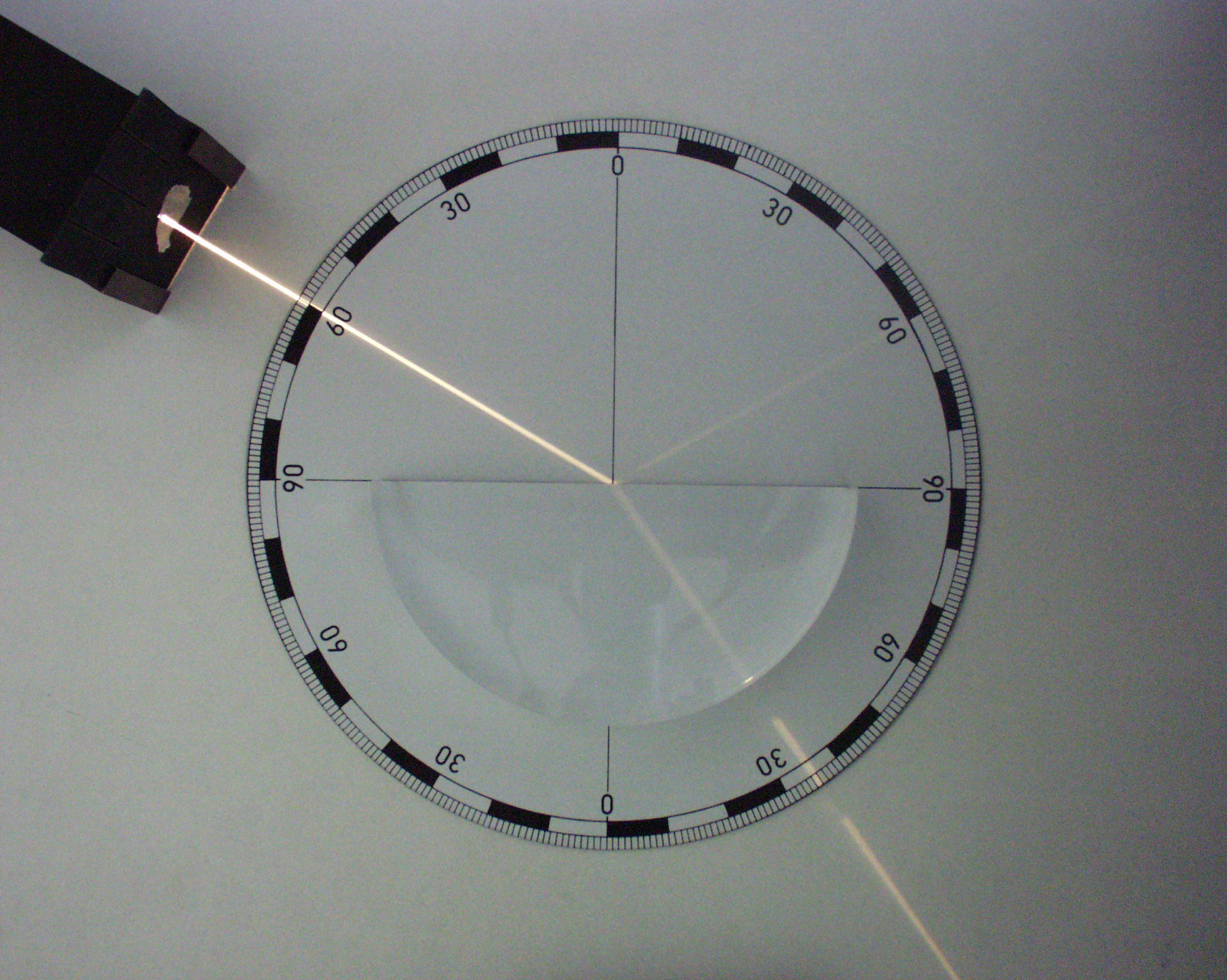

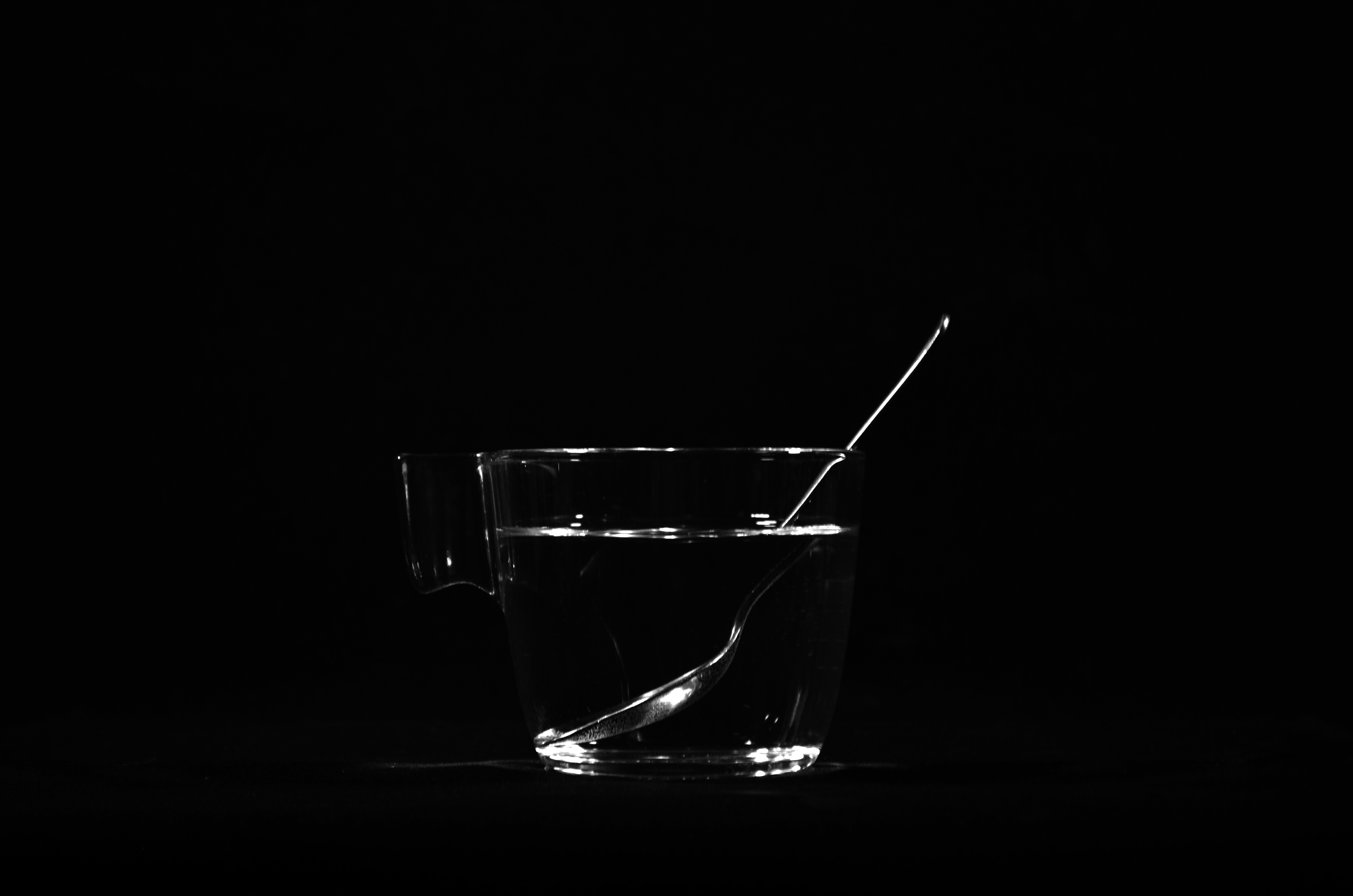

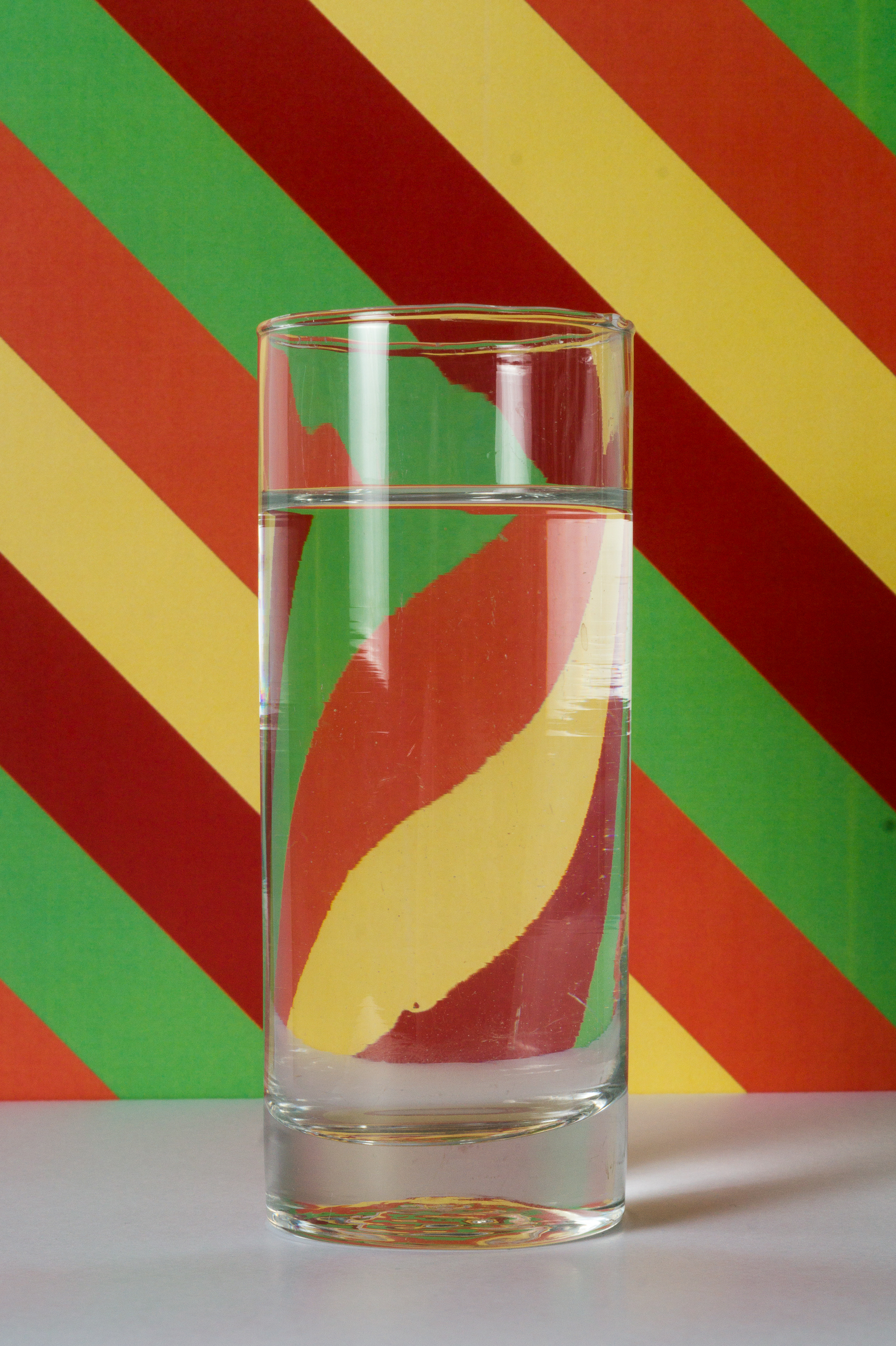

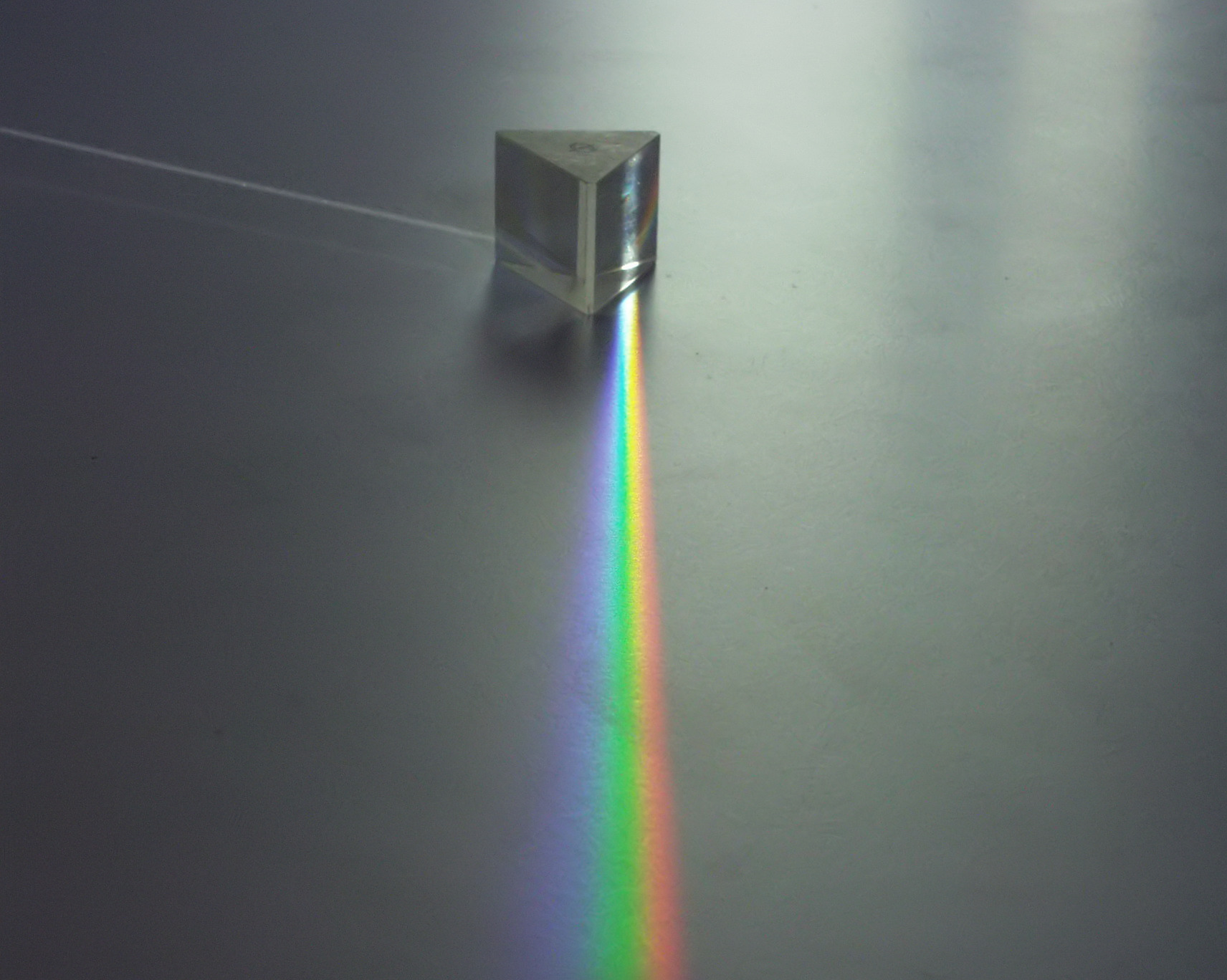

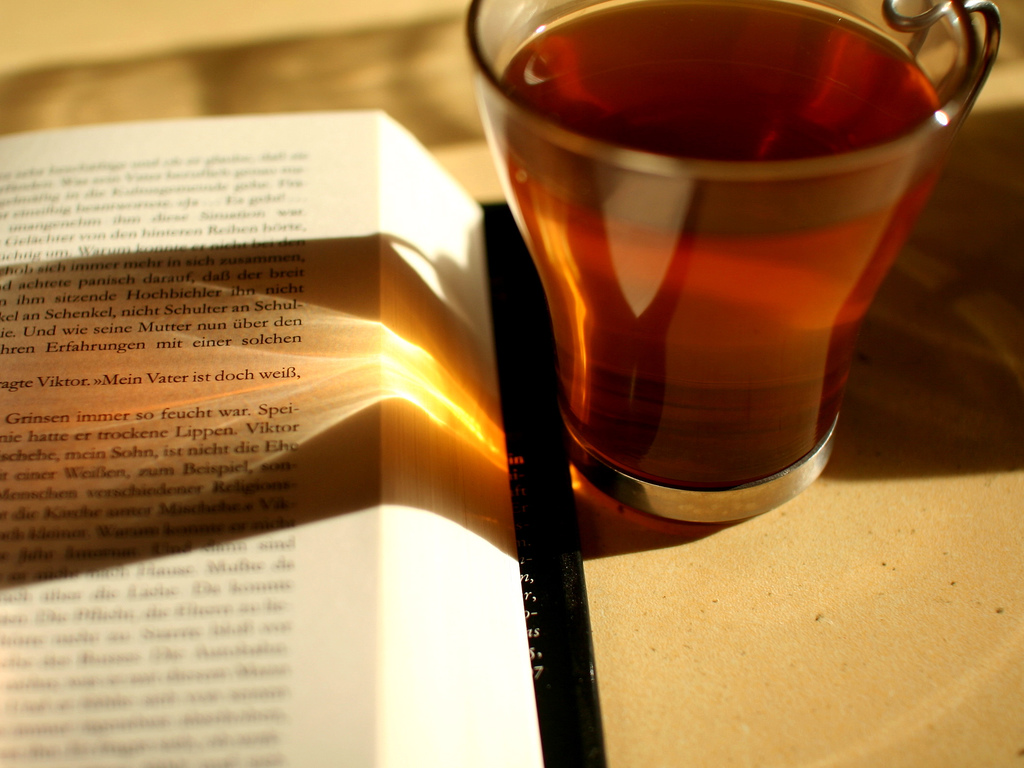

== See also ==
- Birefringence (double refraction)
- Geometrical optics
- Huygens–Fresnel principle
- List of indices of refraction
- Negative refraction
- Reflection
- Schlieren photography
- Seismic refraction
- Super refraction
