= Refraction (sound) =

Change of direction of propagation due to variation of velocity

Refraction, in acoustics, comparable to the refraction of electromagnetic radiation, is the bending of sound propagation trajectories (rays) in inhomogeneous elastic media (gases, liquids, and solids) in which the wave velocity is a function of spatial coordinates. Bending of acoustic rays in layered inhomogeneous media occurs towards a layer with a smaller sound velocity. This effect is responsible for guided propagation of sound waves over long distances in the ocean, including the deep sound channel, and in the atmosphere.

In the atmosphere, vertical gradients of wind speed and temperature lead to refraction. The wind speed is usually increasing with height, which leads to a downward bending of the sound rays towards the ground. The same holds if the temperature is increasing with height (inversion). If the temperature is decreasing with height and the wind speed is low, sound rays are bent upwards.

== See also ==
- Atmospheric refraction
- Deep sound channel
- Sound speed gradient
- Underwater acoustics
