= Weak temperature gradient approximation =

Meteorological concept

In atmospheric science, the weak temperature gradient approximation (WTG) is a theoretical framework used to simplify the equations governing tropical atmospheric dynamics and circulation. The WTG approximation assumes that free tropospheric temperature in the tropics has negligible horizontal (and temporal) gradients compared to its vertical gradient.

The assumption of horizontal homogeneity of temperature follows from observations of free tropospheric temperature in the tropical regions as well as early work on the simplified equations governing tropical circulation. It is understood to occur as a result of the weak Coriolis force in the tropics.

In a multitude of theoretical, modelling and observational studies, the WTG has been applied to study synoptic- and mesoscale phenomena in the tropics.

== Physical explanation ==
Free tropospheric temperature refers to the temperature in the upper layers of the troposphere where the influence from the surface and the boundary layer is negligible. Although the framework is formulated with the gradients of free tropospheric temperature, this phenomenon occurs as a result of gradients and fluctuations in buoyancy. Density or buoyancy fluctuations in a stably stratified fluid lead to the formation of gravity waves. In the tropics, where Coriolis force is negligibly small, these gravity waves prove to be very effective at smoothing out buoyancy gradients, in a process called gravity-wave adjustment or buoyant equalization. This effectively redistributes temperature between regions of precipitating convection and clear-sky region. Due to the speed with which the gravity-wave adjustment occurs, the WTG not only considers negligible horizontal buoyancy gradients but also negligibly small temporal gradients.

As buoyancy is closely related to temperature (more specifically the virtual temperature and the virtual potential temperature), the framework is usually named Weak Temperature Gradient approximation.

=== Equation derivation ===
This framework can be approximated using scale analysis on the governing equations. Starting from the hydrostatic balance

$\frac{\partial p}{\partial z}=-\rho g$

- p: pressure
- $\rho$: density
- g: gravitational acceleration
- z: height above surface

scale analysis suggests that the difference ($\delta$) in pressure at two equal heights $h$ is

$\delta p \sim g h \delta \rho$

These pressure differences can also be analyzed using the Navier-Stokes momentum equation in the tropics with the Coriolis parameter $f \sim 0$

$\frac{d\boldsymbol{u}}{dt}=-\frac{1}{\rho}\delta p$

- $\boldsymbol{u}$ is the horizontal velocity component

Scale analysis now suggests that

$\frac{\delta \rho}{\rho}\sim \frac{\delta p}{p}\sim \frac{\delta \theta}{\theta}\sim \mathcal{F}_r$

where $\mathcal{F}_r=\frac{U^2}{g h}$ is the Froude number, defined as the ratio of vertical inertial force to the gravitational force; $U$ is a horizontal velocity scale. Whereas the same approach for extra-tropical regions would yield

$\frac{\delta \rho}{\rho}\sim \frac{\delta\theta}{\theta}\sim \frac{\mathcal{F}_r}{R_o}$

where $R_o=\frac{U}{f L}$ is the Rossby number with L a characteristic horizontal length scale. This shows that for small Rossby numbers in the extra-tropics, density (and with it temperature) perturbations are much larger than in the tropical regions.

The pressure gradients mentioned above can be understood to be smoothed out by pressure gradient forces which in the tropics, unlike the mid-latitudes, are not balanced by Coriolis force and thus efficiently remove horizontal gradients.

== Applications ==
The assumption of negligible horizontal temperature gradient has significant implications for the study of the interactions between large scale circulation and convection in the tropics. Although, the WTG does not directly apply to the humidity field, latent heat release from phase changes related to convective activity affects temperature and therefore moisture must also be considered. The WTG approximation allows for models and studies to fix the free tropospheric temperature profile, usually using the reversible moist adiabat. The use of the moist adiabat is not only supported by observations but also by the fact that gravity waves efficiently disperse the vertical structure of deep convective areas across the tropics. From the conservation of dry static energy, the WTG can be used to derive the WTG balance equation

$\omega \frac{\partial \eta_d}{\partial p}\sim Q$

- $\eta_d$: dry static energy
- $\omega$: vertical pressure velocity
- Q: diabatic heating

where the diabatic heating represents surface fluxes, radiation and latent heat effects. This suggests that variations in a diabatic atmosphere allow for a formulation of equations for which temperature variations must follow a balance between vertical motions and diabatic heating.

There are two ways to interpret this conclusion. The first, classical interpretation is that the large scale circulation creates conditions for atmospheric convection to occur. The alternate, more important interpretation is that the surface fluxes and latent heat effects are processes which control the large scale circulation. In this case, a heat source would cause a temperature anomaly which, in the WTG, would get smoothed out by gravity waves. Due to energetic constraints, this would lead to a large-scale vertical motion to cool the column. Using this framework, a coupling between large scale vertical motion and diabatic heating in the tropics is achieved.

=== Models ===
The weak temperature gradient approximation is often used in models with limited domains as a way to couple large-scale vertical motion and small scale diabatic heating. Generally, this has been done by neglecting horizontal free-tropospheric temperature variations (to first order), while explicitly retaining fluid dynamical aspects and diabatic processes.

Many studies implemented the WTG constraint in radiative-convective equilibrium (RCE) models, by fixing the mean virtual temperature profile. Often this creates opposing results with either dry, non-precipitating states or heavily-precipitating states, depending on the stability of the constrained temperature profile. The WTG has also been used as a parametrization for large-scale motion in cloud-permitting models.

Bulk, single column models, can also be developed with the WTG. Although these models usually treat temperature prognostically while constraining the large-scale vertical motion, using the WTG approximation, large scale vertical motion becomes a diagnostic variable, dependent on static stability and humidity. Due to the strong coupling between vertical motion and precipitation, the WTG approach allows the study of precipitation distribution, also in the bulk setup.

Using the WTG framework, many different processes have been studied and better understood. These include, both synoptic processes such as the Walker Cell and the Madden Julian Oscillation and also mesoscale processes such as, the diurnal cycle of convection, convective self-aggregation and tropical cyclone formation.
