= Temperature gradient =

Temperature difference per unit of length

A temperature gradient is a physical quantity that describes in which direction and at what rate the temperature changes the most rapidly around a particular location. The temperature spatial gradient is a vector quantity with dimension of temperature difference per unit length. The SI unit is kelvin per meter (K/m). Temperature gradients in the atmosphere are important in the atmospheric sciences (meteorology, climatology and related fields). A temperature gradiometer or thermal gradiometer is a scientific instrument (a gradiometer) for measuring temperature gradients.

== Mathematical description ==
Assuming that the temperature T is an intensive quantity, i.e., a single-valued, continuous and differentiable function of three-dimensional space (often called a scalar field), i.e., that

$$T=T(x,y,z)$$

where x, y and z are the coordinates of the location of interest, then the temperature gradient is the vector quantity defined as

$$\nabla T = \begin{pmatrix}
{\frac{\partial T}{\partial x}},
{\frac{\partial T}{\partial y}},
{\frac{\partial T}{\partial z}}
\end{pmatrix}$$

== Physical processes ==
=== Meteorology ===
Differences in air temperature between different locations are critical in weather forecasting and climate analysis. The absorption of solar light at or near the planetary surface increases the temperature gradient and results in convection (a major process of cloud formation, often associated with precipitation). Meteorological fronts are regions where the horizontal temperature gradient reaches relatively high values, as these are boundaries between air masses with distinct properties.

Atmospheric temperature gradients can change substantially over time, most commonly due to diurnal or seasonal heating and cooling. One example is an inversion, a situation in which the temperature at ground level is colder than higher up in the atmosphere. This often occurs over night under clear skies which allow the ground to radiate to space without much absorption in the overlying atmosphere.

=== Weathering ===
Expansion and contraction of rock, caused by temperature changes during a wildfire, through thermal stress weathering, may result in thermal shock and subsequent structure failure.

== See also ==
- Atmospheric temperature for gradient of Earth's atmosphere
- Geothermal gradient
- Gradient
- Lapse rate
- Weak temperature gradient approximation
