= Acoustic shadow =

Area impenetrable by sound waves

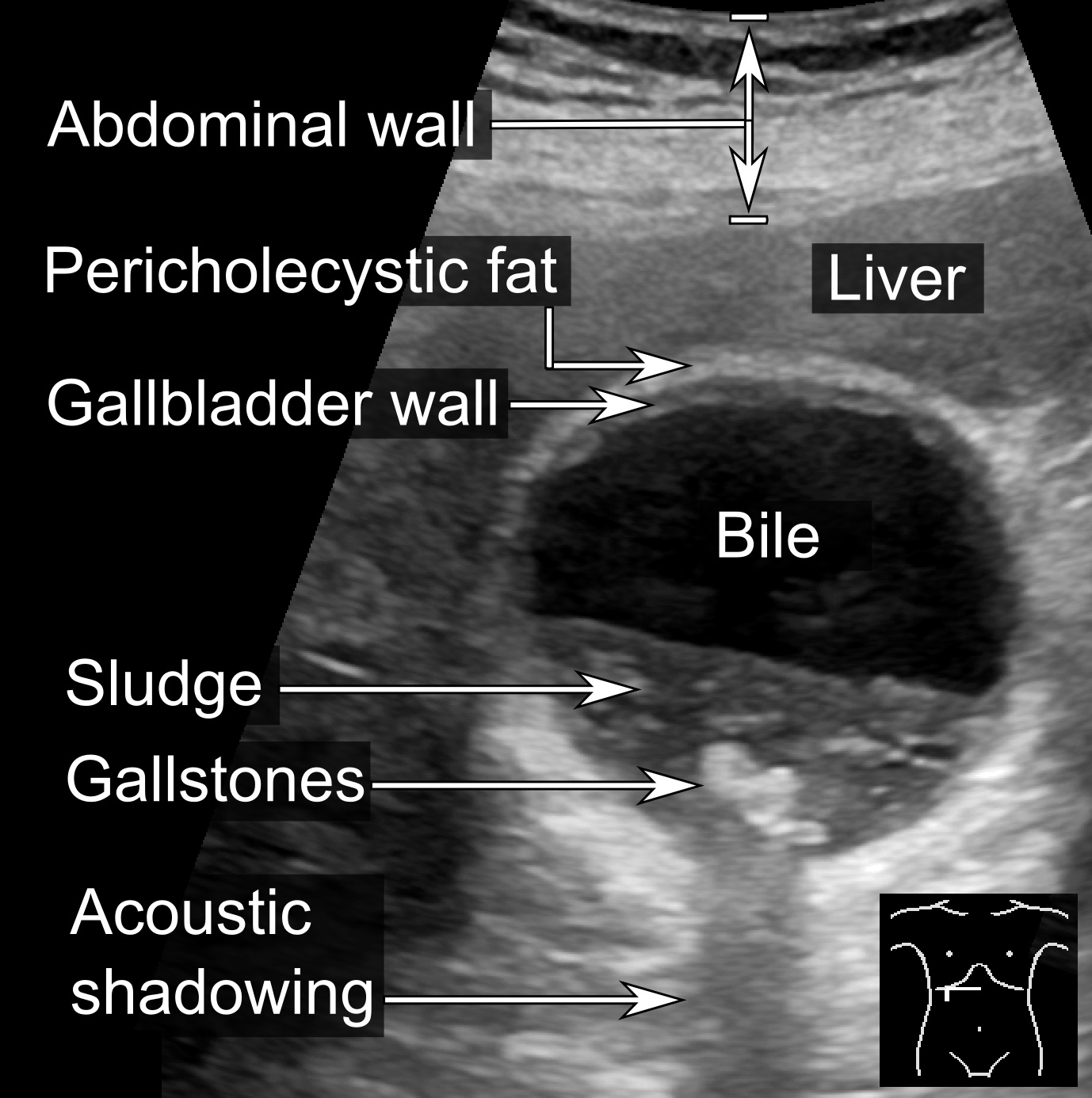
Abdominal ultrasonography, where gallstones create acoustic shadowing of the ultrasound, seen at bottom.

An acoustic shadow or sound shadow is an area through which sound waves fail to propagate, due to topographical obstructions or disruption of the waves via phenomena such as wind currents, buildings, or sound barriers.

== Short-distance acoustic shadow ==
A short-distance acoustic shadow occurs behind a building or a sound barrier. The sound from a source is shielded by the obstruction. Due to diffraction around the object, it will not be completely silent in the sound shadow. The amplitude of the sound can be reduced considerably, however, depending on the additional distance the sound has to travel between source and receiver.

== Long-distance acoustic shadow ==
Anomalous sound propagation in the atmosphere can occur in certain conditions of wind, temperature and pressure. Such conditions enable sound to travel in refraction channels over long distances until returning to the Earth's surface, and it thus may not be heard in intervening locations. As one website refers to it, "an acoustic shadow is to sound what a mirage is to light". For example, at the Battle of Iuka, a northerly wind prevented General Ulysses S. Grant from hearing the sounds of battle and sending more troops. Many other instances of acoustic shadowing were prevalent during the American Civil War, including the Battles of Seven Pines, Gaines' Mill, Perryville and Five Forks. Indeed, this is addressed in the Ken Burns's documentary The Civil War, which aired on PBS in September 1990. Observers of nearby battles would sometimes see the smoke and flashes of light from cannon but not hear the corresponding roar of battle, while those in more distant locations would hear the sounds distinctly.

Two diarists John Evelyn and Samuel Pepys heard from London the naval guns of the Four Days' Battle, which ranged over the southern North Sea between England and the Flanders coast. However the guns were not heard at all in towns on the coast nearer to the action:

Being in my garden at 6 o'clock in the evening, and hearing the great guns go thick off, I took horse and rode ...next day toward the Downs and seacoast, but meeting the Lieutenant of the Hampshire frigate, who told me what passed, or rather what had not passed, I returned to London, there being no noise, or appearance at Deal, or on that coast of any engagement. Recounting this to his Majesty...he was astonished when I assured him they heard nothing of the guns in the Downs, nor did the Lieutenant who landed there by five that morning.

— Friday 1 June 1666, The Diary of John Evelyn

...so far as to yesterday it is a miraculous thing that we all Friday, and Saturday and yesterday, did hear every where most plainly the guns go off, and yet at Deale and Dover to last night they did not hear one word of a fight, nor think they heard one gun. This...makes room for a great dispute in philosophy, how we should hear it and they not, the same wind that brought it to us being the same that should bring it to them: but so it is..

— Monday 4 June 1666, The Diary of Samuel Pepys

== See also ==
- Wind gradient § Sound propagation for a fuller explanation of the phenomenon.
- Gobo (recording)
