= Mirage of astronomical objects =

Meteorological optical phenomenon

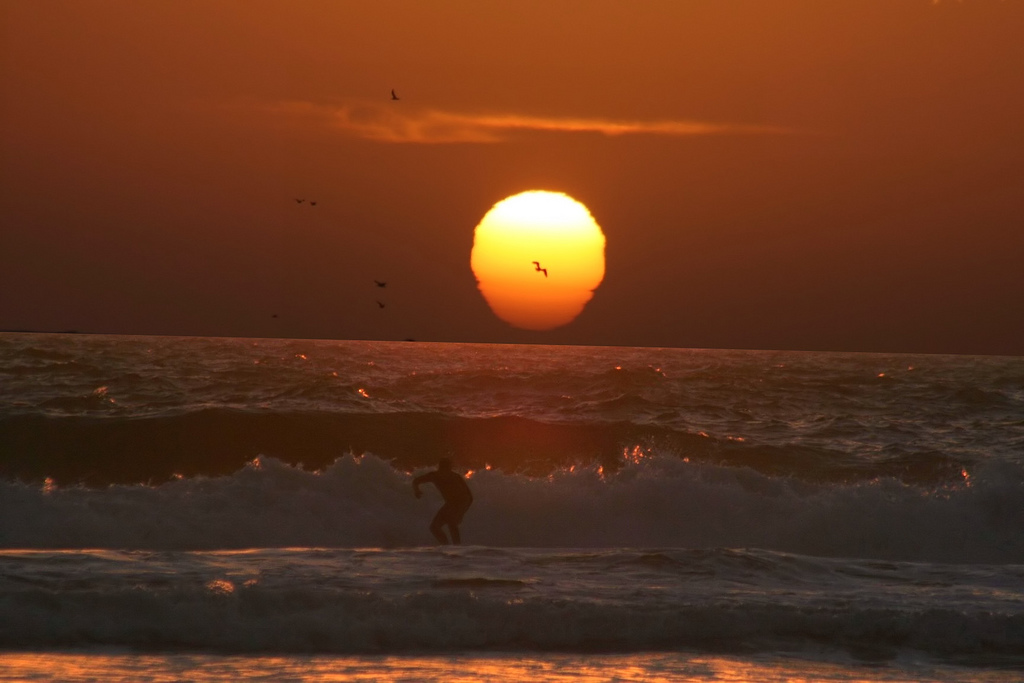
A mock mirage of the setting Sun

A mirage of an astronomical object is a meteorological optical phenomenon, in which light rays are bent to produce distorted or multiple images of an astronomical object. The mirages might be observed for such celestial objects as the Sun, the Moon, the planets, bright stars, and very bright comets. The most commonly observed of these are sunset and sunrise mirages.

== Mirages versus refraction ==
Mirages are distinguished from other phenomena caused by atmospheric refraction. One of the most prominent features of mirages is that a mirage might only produce images vertically, not sideways, while a simple refraction might distort and bend the images in any way.

The distortion in both images displayed in this section was caused by refraction, but while the image on the left, which is a mirage, demonstrates only vertical distortion, the image on the right demonstrates distortion in all the ways possible. It is easier to see the vertical direction of the mirage not even at the mirage of the Sun itself, but rather at the mirage of a sunspot. As a matter of fact, it is at least a three-image mirage of a sunspot, and all these images show a clear vertical direction.

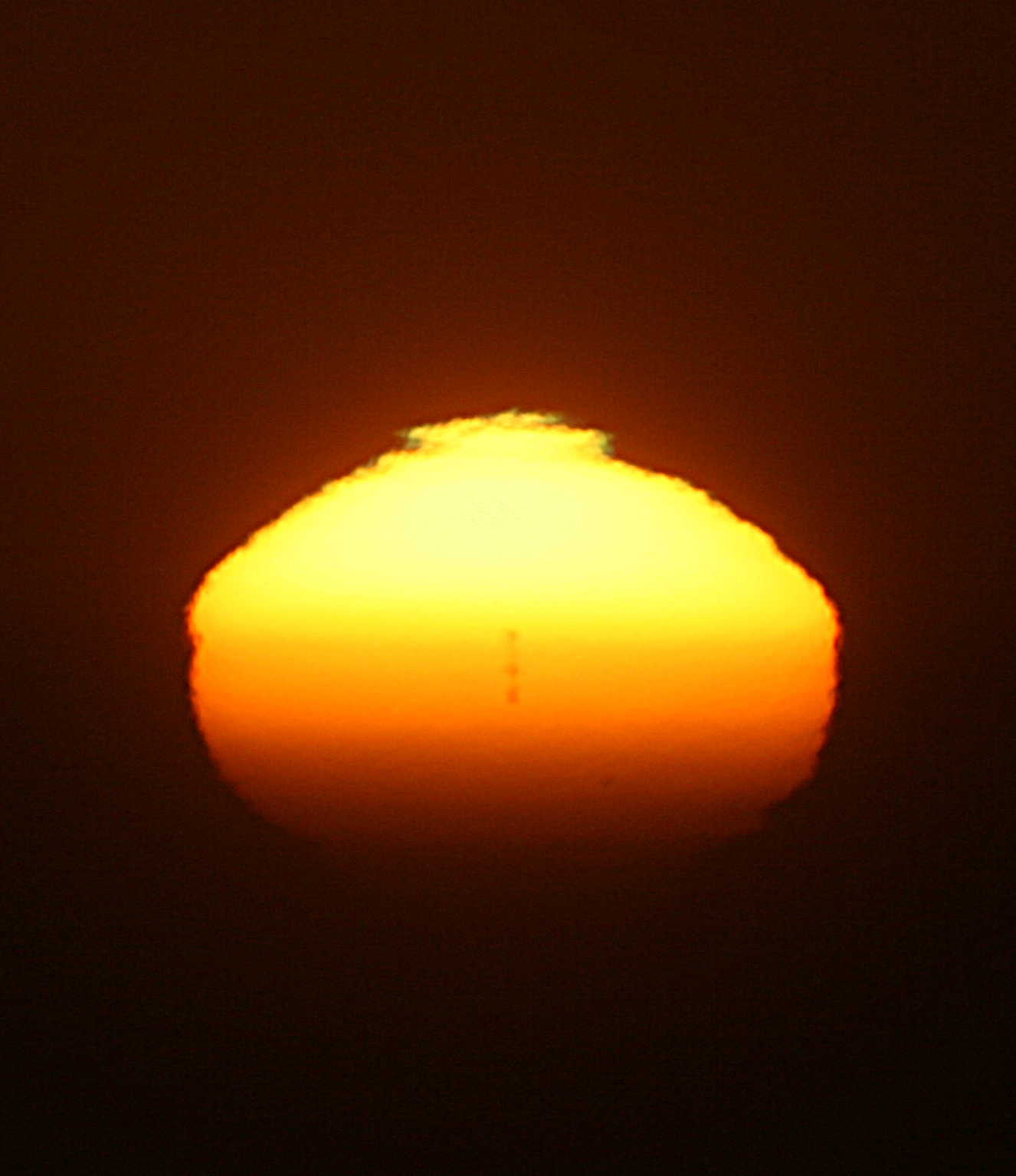
Superior mirage (3-image mirage) of sunspot #930

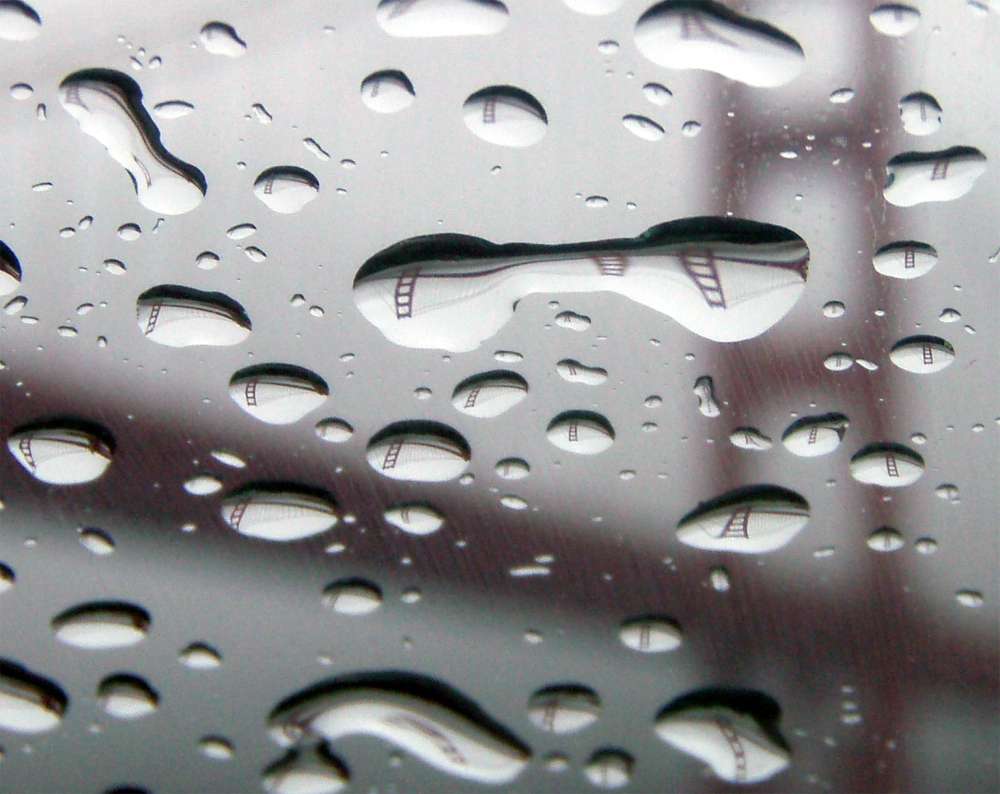
An image of the Golden Gate Bridge is refracted and bent by droplets of water.

== Inferior mirage ==
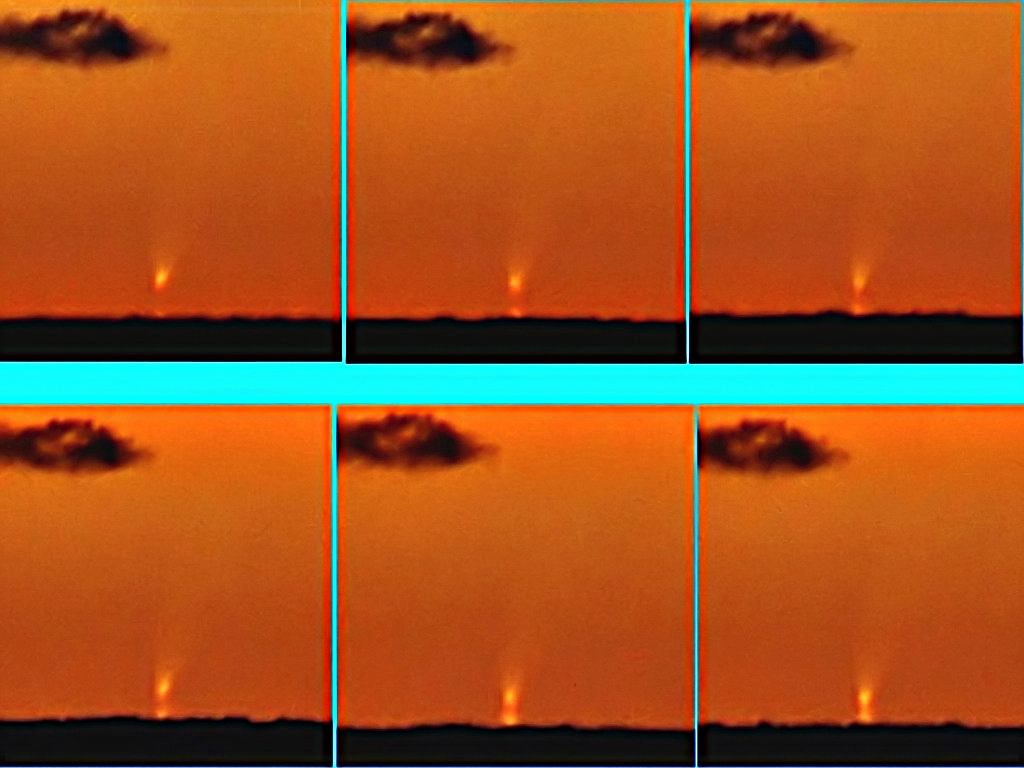
Inferior mirage of comet C/2006 P1 McNaught

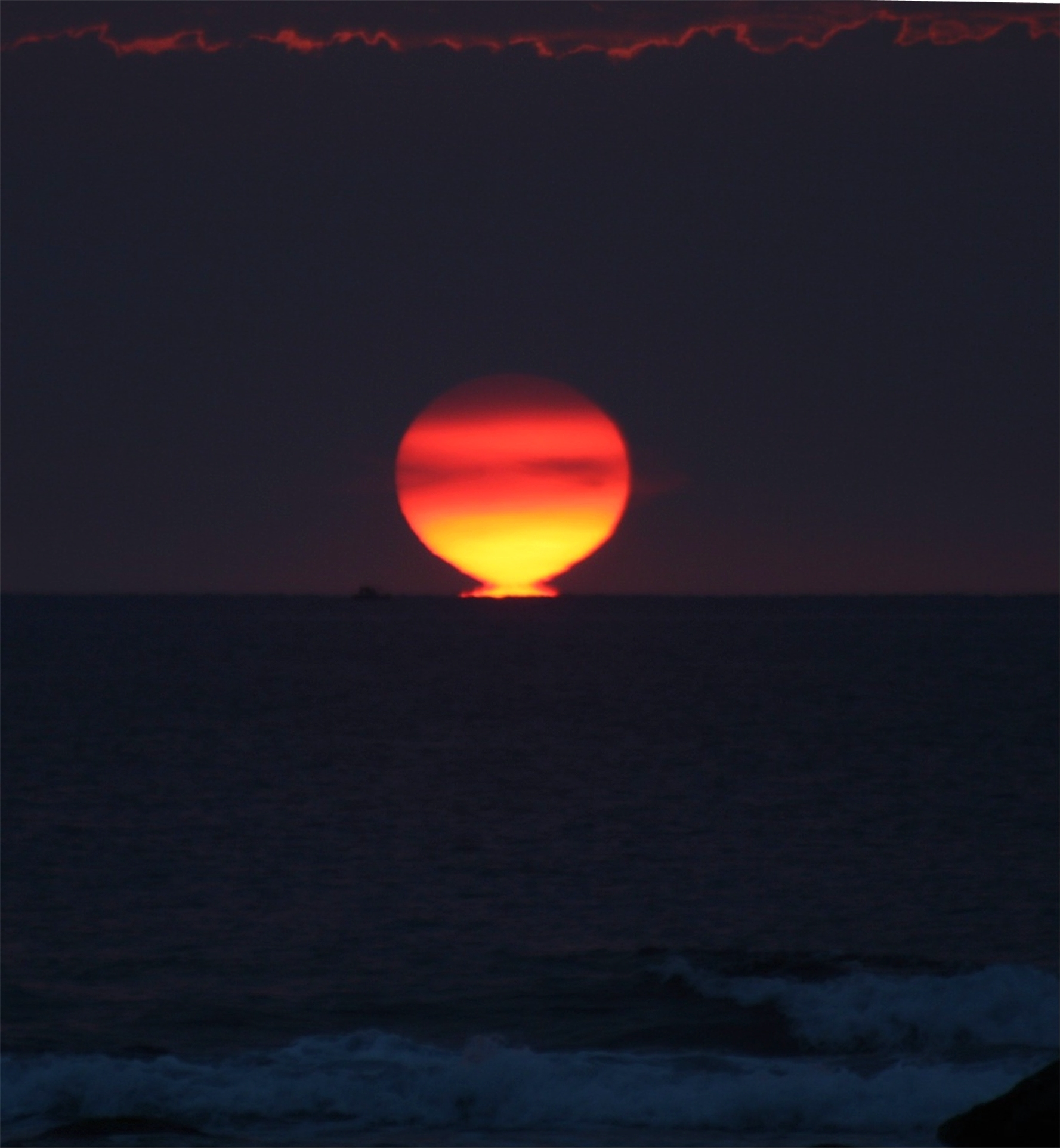
Etruscan vase stage of inferior mirage sunset in Hawaii

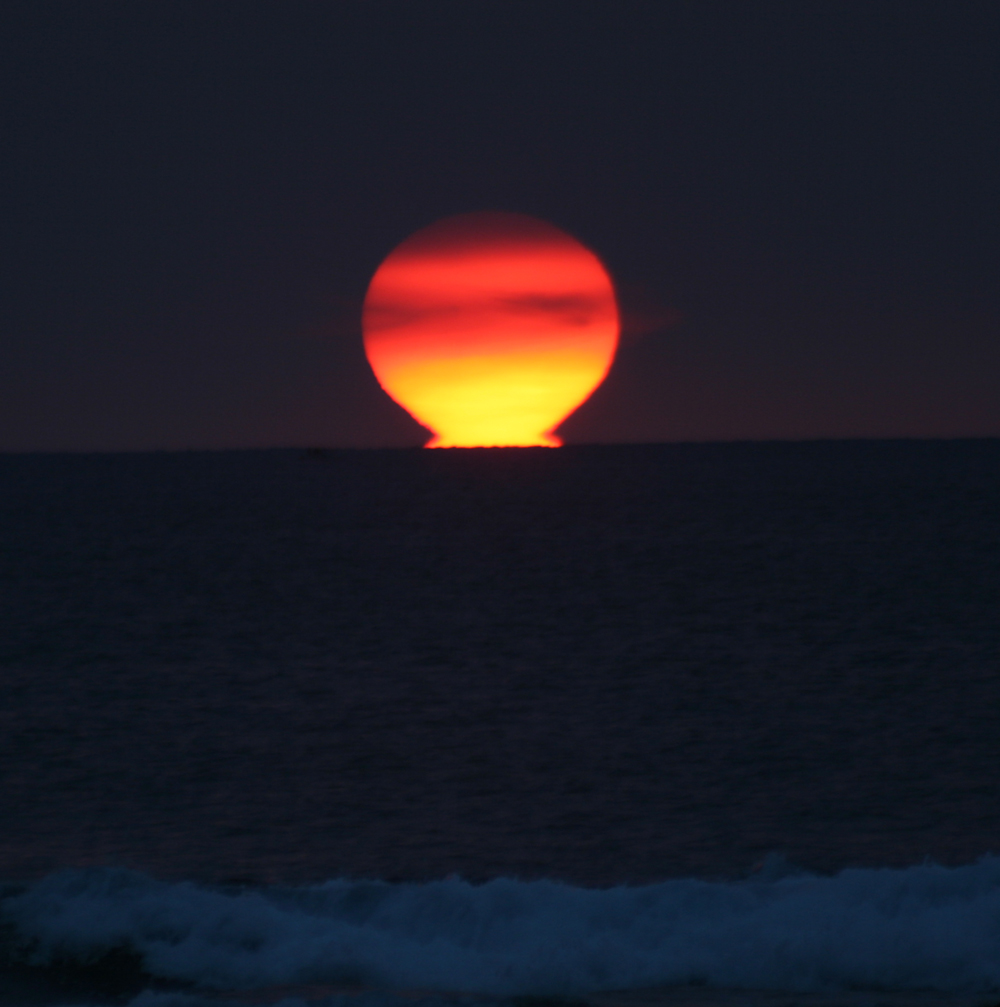
Omega Sun stage of inferior mirage sunset in Hawaii

Inferior mirage of astronomical objects is the most common mirage. Inferior mirage occurs when the surface of the Earth or the oceans produces a layer of hot air of lower density, just at the surface. There are two images, the inverted one and the erect one, in inferior mirage. They both are displaced from the geometric direction to the actual object. While the erect image is setting, the inverted image appears to be rising from the surface.

The shapes of inferior mirage sunsets and sunrises stay the same for all inferior mirage sunsets and sunrises. One well-known shape, the Etruscan vase, was named by Jules Verne. As the sunset progresses the shape of Etruscan vase slowly changes; the stem of the vase gets shorter until the real and the miraged Suns create a new shape – Greek letter omega Ω. The inferior mirage got its name because the inverted image appears below the erect one.

Here's how Jules Verne describes an inferior mirage sunset.

All eyes were again turned towards the west. The sun seemed to sink with greater rapidity as it approached the sea; it threw a long trail of dazzling light over the trembling surface of the water; its disk soon changed from a shade of old gold, to fiery red, and, through their half-closed eyes, seemed to glitter with all the varying shades of a kaleidoscope. Faint, waving lines streaked the quivering trail of light cast on the surface of the water, like a spangled mass of glittering gems. Not the faintest sign of cloud, haze, or mist was visible along the whole of the horizon, which was as clearly defined as a black line traced on white paper. Motionless, and with intense excitement, they watched the fiery globe as it sank nearer and nearer the horizon, and, for an instant, hung suspended over the abyss. Then, through the refraction of the rays, its disk seemed to change till it looked like an Etruscan vase, with bulging sides, standing on the water.

On very rare occasions the mirages of astronomical objects other than the Sun and the Moon might be observed. An apparent magnitude of an astronomical object should be low enough (that is, bright enough) in order to see it as not only a real object, but also a miraged one.

== Mock mirage ==
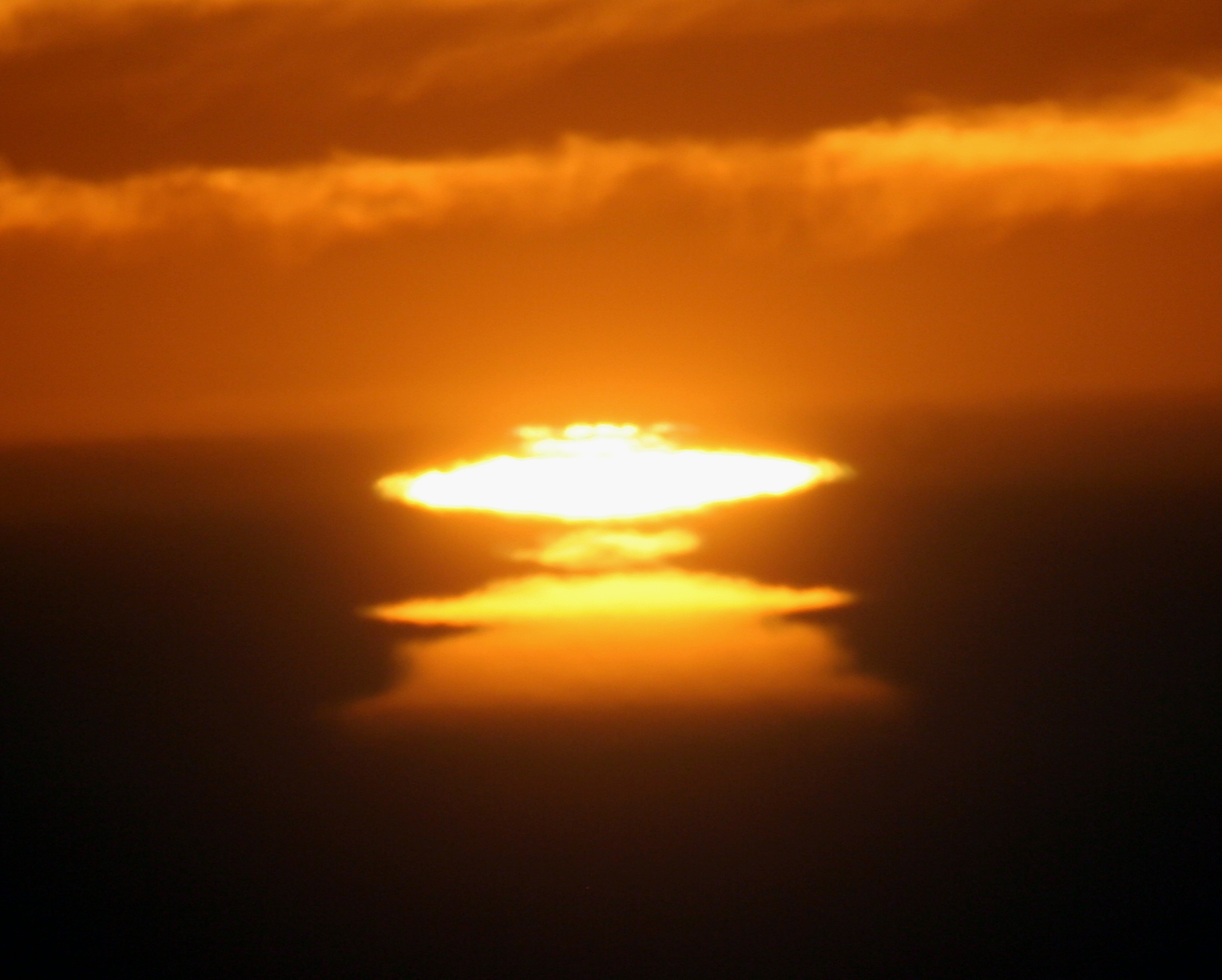
Pancake-like shape of the setting Sun in a mock mirage

A mock mirage of astronomical objects is much more complex than an inferior mirage. While an inferior mirage of astronomical objects can produce only two images, a mock mirage can produce multiple miraged images. The shapes of the miraged object are changing constantly and unpredictably. In order for a mock mirage to appear, the cooler air needs to be trapped below the inversion. Several inversion layers produce multiple pancake-like shapes.

It is possible that the solar anomaly mentioned in the Book of Joshua may have been an example of a mock mirage. In that tale, Joshua launched a surprise attack on the Amorites following a night march, causing the Amorites to panic and flee as far as Beth-horon, but they did not find a safe haven there. "...they were more who died with the hailstones than they whom the children of Israel slew with the sword." Hailstones are a rare event in deserts and are a good precondition for creating a mock/superior mirage of the setting sun. Inferior mirage is the most common mirage in the deserts. When the Israelites went from a hot desert to a hail-covered desert to fight the Amorites, the inversion layers could have created a mock mirage of the setting sun. To the Israelites, the sun would then have appeared to stand still. A poem is quoted from the Book of Jasher, which states that the Sun stood still at Gibeon, and the Moon in the valley of Ajalon, in order that Joshua could complete the battle.

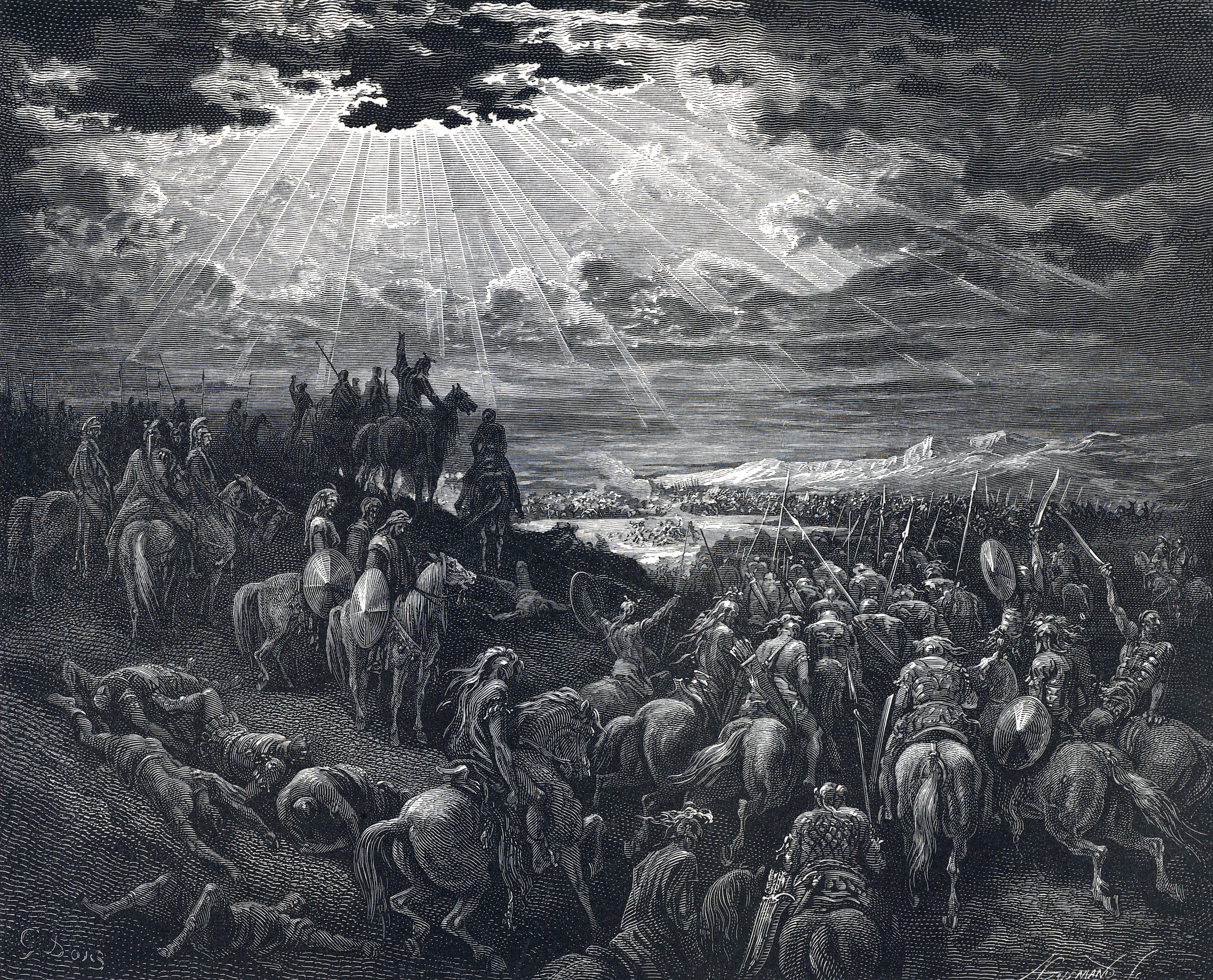
Joshua commands the Sun to stand still in the sky

10.12 Then spoke Joshua to the LORD in the day when the LORD delivered up the Amorites before the children of Israel; and he said in the sight of Israel: 'Sun, stand thou still upon Gibeon; and thou, Moon, in the valley of Aijalon.
10.13 And the sun stood still, and the moon stayed, until the nation had avenged themselves of their enemies. Is not this written in the book of Jashar? And the sun stayed in the midst of heaven, and hasted not to go down about a whole day.

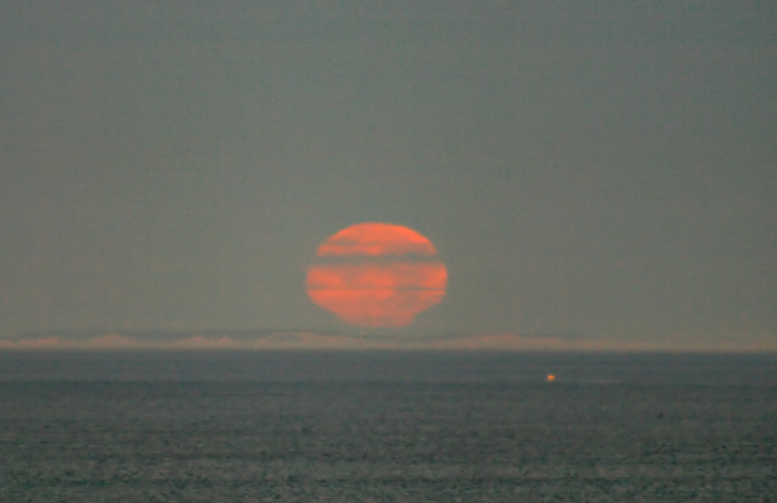
Mock mirage of the setting Moon

== Novaya Zemlya effect ==
Due to a normal atmospheric refraction, sunrise occurs shortly before the Sun crosses above the horizon. Light from the Sun is bent, or refracted, as it enters Earth's atmosphere. This effect causes the apparent sunrise to be earlier than the actual sunrise. Similarly, apparent sunset occurs slightly later than actual sunset.

In ordinary atmospheric conditions, the setting or rising Sun appears to be about half a degree above its geometric position. But sometimes, very unusual atmospheric circumstances can make it to be visible when it is really between two and five degrees below the horizon. This is called the Novaya Zemlya effect, because it was first observed in Novaya Zemlya, where the Sun was seen when, according to astronomical calculations, it should have been two degrees below the horizon.

However, due to changes in air pressure, relative humidity, and other quantities, the exact effects of atmospheric refraction on sunrise and sunset time cannot be predicted. Also note that this possible error increases with higher (closer to the poles) latitudes.

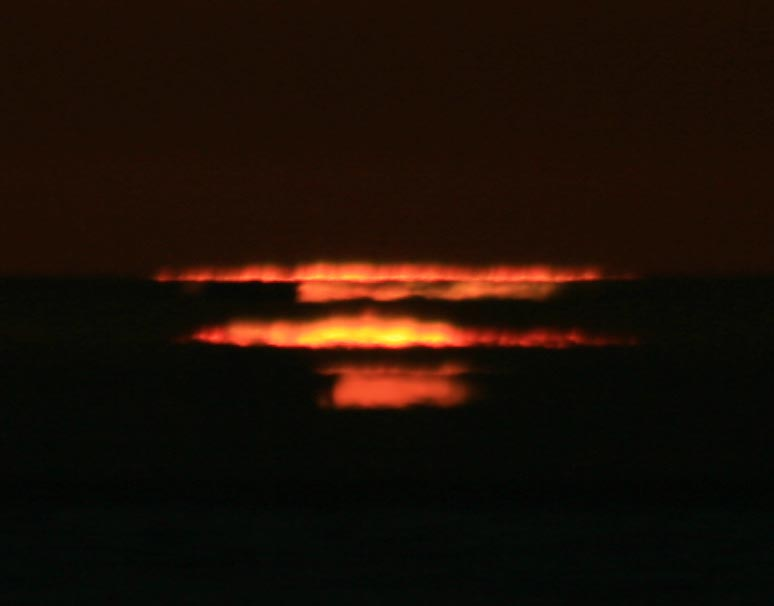
This mock mirage sunset was photographed in San Francisco four minutes later than apparent sunset time. It cannot be considered the Novaya Zemlya effect, yet it gives a good visual representation of what Fridtjof Nansen may have seen when he was observing the phenomenon.

Novaya Zemlya is a polar region in Russia. The Novaya Zemlya effect is a mirage caused by high refraction of sunlight between atmospheric thermoclines. The Novaya Zemlya effect will give the impression that the sun is rising earlier than it actually should or the sun is setting later than it actually should.

Fridtjof Nansen wrote

The mirage was at first like a flattened-out glowing red streak of fire on the horizon; later there were two streaks, one above the other, with a dark space between; and from the main-top I could see four, or even five, such horizontal lines directly over one another, and all of equal length; as if one could only imagine a square dull-red sun with horizontal dark streaks across it. An astronomical observation we took in the afternoon showed that the sun must in reality have been 2° 22' below the horizon at noon; we cannot expect to see its disk above the ice before Tuesday at the earliest; it depends on the refraction, which is very strong in this cold air.

It is possible to observe the Novaya Zemlya effect in any place, where the temperature variations are great enough to produce a high refraction.

== Green flash ==
Green flash is a rare optical phenomenon that occurs during or shortly after set and during or before rise of a bright astronomical object, when a green spot is visible for a short period of time above a mirage of an astronomical object or its set/rise point. Green flashes are enhanced by atmospheric inversions which increase the density gradient in the atmosphere, and therefore increase refraction. In other words, to see a green flash a mirage should be present.

Jules Verne described a green flash.

...it will be ' green,' but a most wonderful green, a green which no artist could ever obtain on his palette, a green which neither the varied tints of vegetation nor the shades of the most limpid sea could ever produce the like ! If there be green in Paradise, it cannot but be of this shade, which most surely is the true green of Hope !

Many tend to believe that seeing a green flash brings good luck.

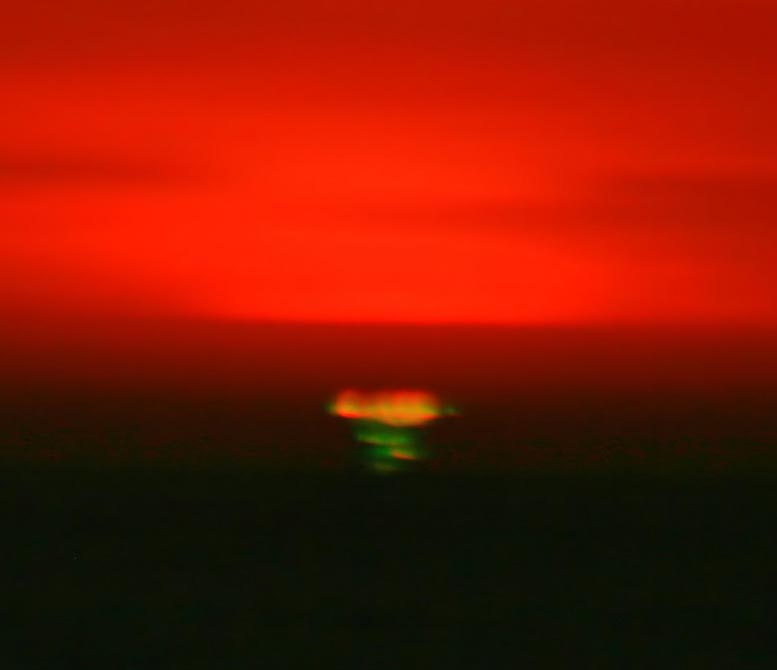
Green flash

Stories are told,
By Sailors of old,
Who sought more than distant shore.
When looking asea
Alert ye be,
And by chance ye might see more.

At setting sun
When day is done,
While lanyards ye do lash.
Where sea meets sky
Keep watchful eye
For the Mystical Green Flash.

If luck be there
And it catch your stare,
Your fortune turns my mate.
Night sky is red
Smooth sail ahead,
A charmed life is your fate.

Sure as Neptune guides
The ocean tides,
Where his dolphins leap and splash.
Favorable days
Await those who gaze
'Pon the Mystical Green Flash.

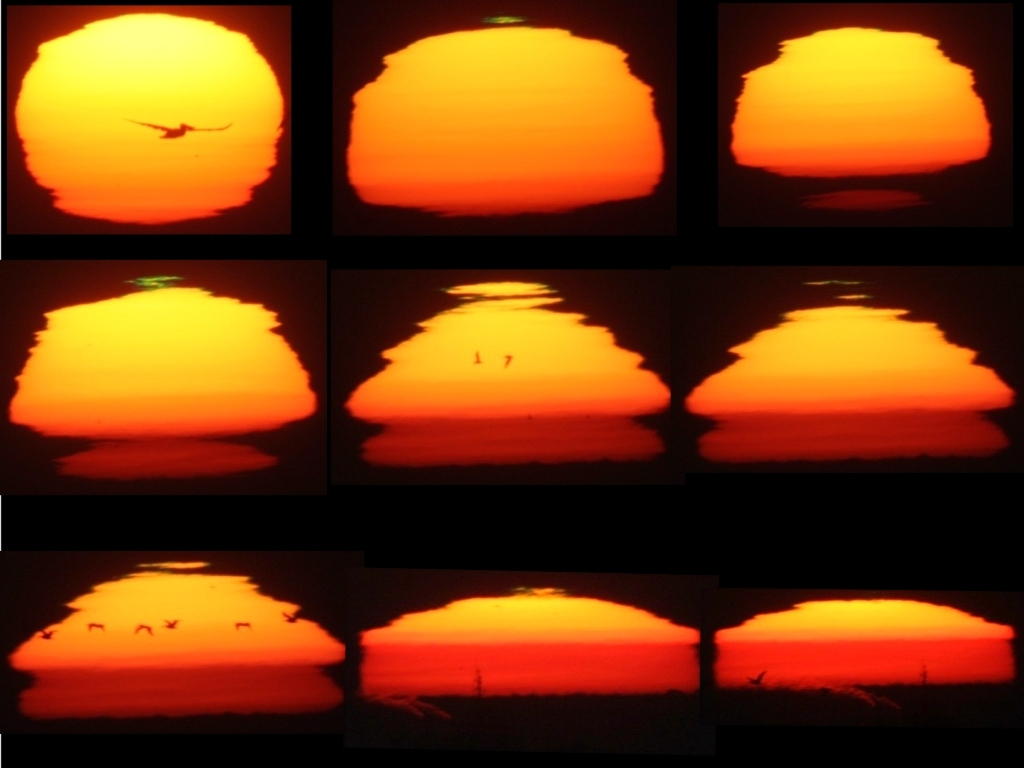
Sunset sequence with two green flashes in the second and fourth frames

Green flashes might be observed from any place with a low horizon. Deserts, oceans and ice shelves are probably the best places to observe mirages and therefore green flashes. It is easier not to miss a green flash during sunset than during sunrise. It is especially true regarding an inferior mirage green flash, when the timing should be just right to capture it at sunrise.

I could see the sun glowing below the distant horizon. Then, for what seemed like at least a second, the green flash flooded the desert like an alien heliograph. A moment later, the skyline erupted with the instant magnificence of the sun, its sudden warmth.

From the above observation it is clear that the author observed an inferior mirage green flash, when the much warmer surface of the desert with the help of the rising Sun was fighting the cool morning air, producing in the process the flash.

A green flash might be also seen with a rising or setting Moon.

In the right conditions it is common to observe multiple green flashes during one mock mirage sunset.
Some claim they saw a green flash from Venus. This may be true, but it might be that a color of the setting or the rising planet is mistaken for a real green flash that is a by-product of a mirage.

== Green rim ==
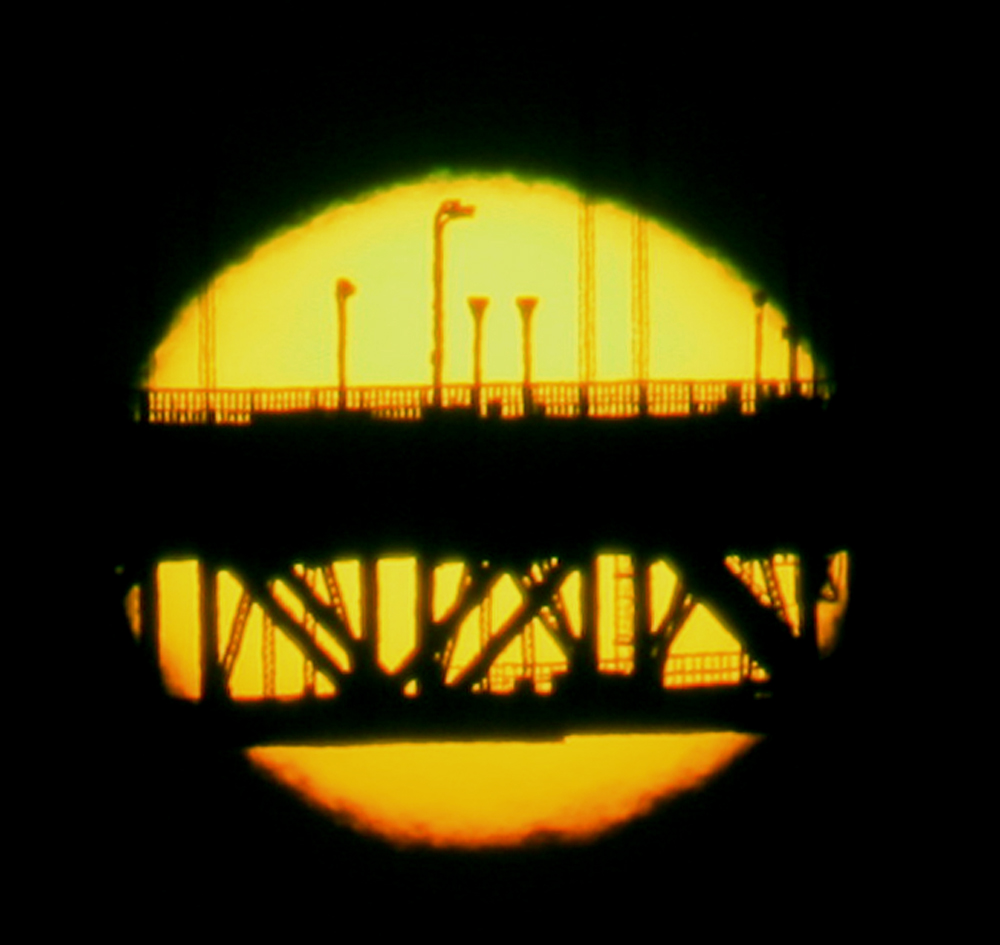
The upper rim of the Sun is green while the lower rim is red in this image taken as the Sun sets behind the Golden Gate Bridge.

As an astronomical object sets or rises, the light it emits travels through the atmosphere, which works as a prism separating the light into different colors. The color of the upper limb of an astronomical object could go from blue to green to violet depending on the decrease in concentration of pollutants as they spread throughout an increasing volume of atmosphere. The lower limb of an astronomical object is always red.

The green rim is very thin, and is difficult or impossible to see with the naked eye. In usual conditions a green rim of an astronomical object gets fainter, when an astronomical object is very low above the horizon because of atmospheric reddening, but sometimes the conditions are right to see a green rim just above the horizon.

The following quote describes probably the longest observation of a green rim, which sometimes could have been a green flash. Members of Richard E. Byrd's party from the Little America exploration base saw the phenomenon on and off for 35 minutes ^{(source for 30 versus 35 minutes?)}.

SEEN FOR HALF HOUR
There was a rush for the surface and as eyes turned southward, they saw a tiny but brilliant green spot where the last ray of the upper limb of the sun hung on the skyline. It lasted an appreciable length of time, several seconds at least, and no sooner disappeared than it flashed forth again. Altogether it remained on the horizon with short interruptions for thirty-five minutes.
When it disappeared momentarily it seemed to have been shut off by a tiny spurt, an inequality in the skyline caused by the barrier surface.
Even by moving the head up a few inches it would disappear and reappear again and after it had finally disappeared from view it could be recaptured by climbing up the first few steps of the antanea [sic] post.

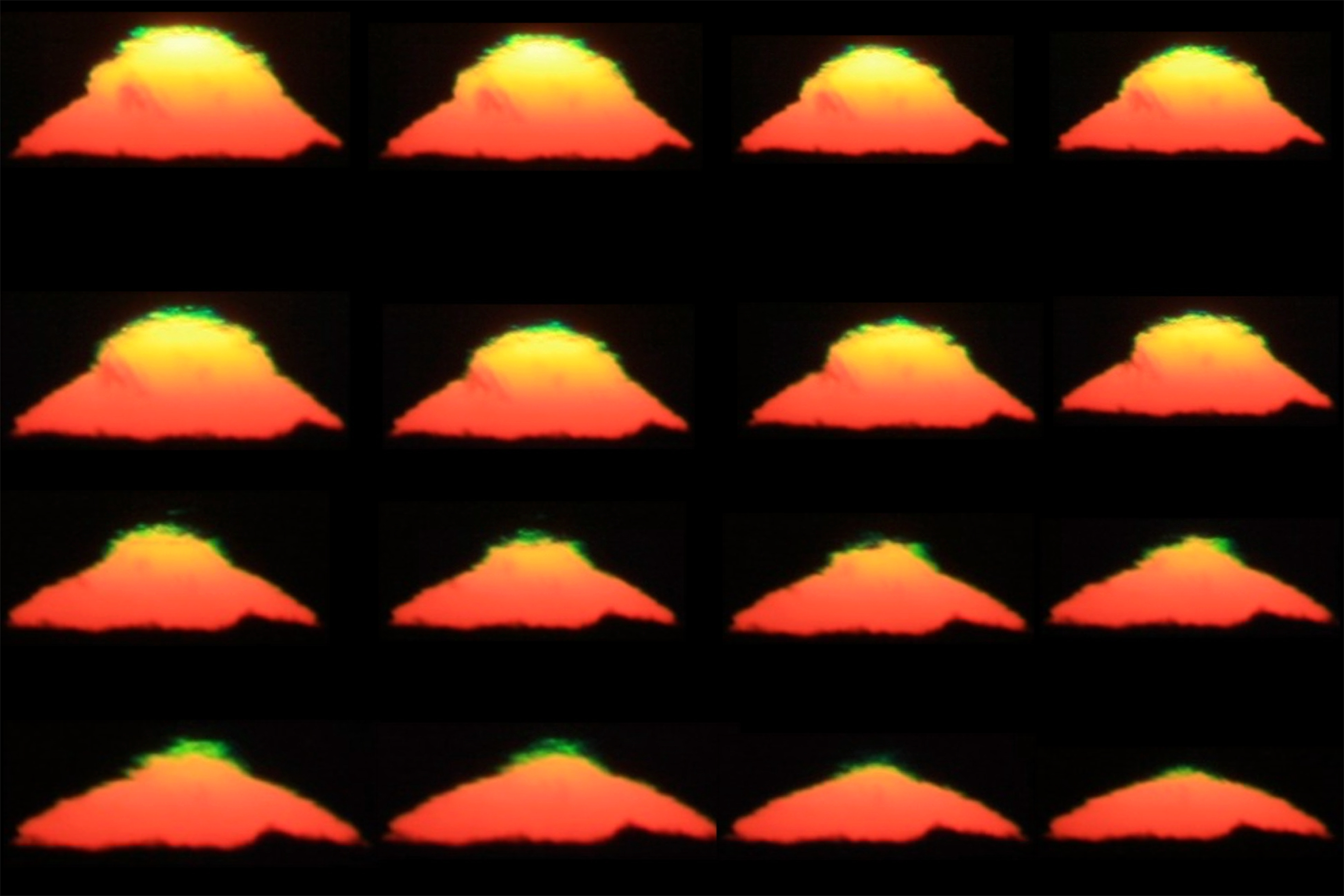
Green rim and green flashes of the setting Sun

Often the green rim of the setting Sun will change to a green flash and then back again to a green rim during the same sunset. The image to the right might accurately illustrate what members of Byrd's party from the Little America base might have seen.

However, to see a green rim and green flash on and off for 35 minutes, there must have been some degree of mirage present.

A green rim is present in every sunset, but it is too thin to be seen with a naked eye. The best time to observe the green rim is about 10 minutes before sunset time. However, the solar disc is too bright at that time to use magnification, such as binoculars or telescopes, to look directly at the Sun. Of course, a telescope or binoculars image can be projected on a sheet of paper for viewing. When the Sun gets closer to the horizon, the green rim gets fainter because of atmospheric reddening. Although a green rim is present in every sunset, and a green flash is rare because it requires a mirage to be present, it is actually more common for people to have seen a green flash rather than a green rim.

== Not a mirage ==
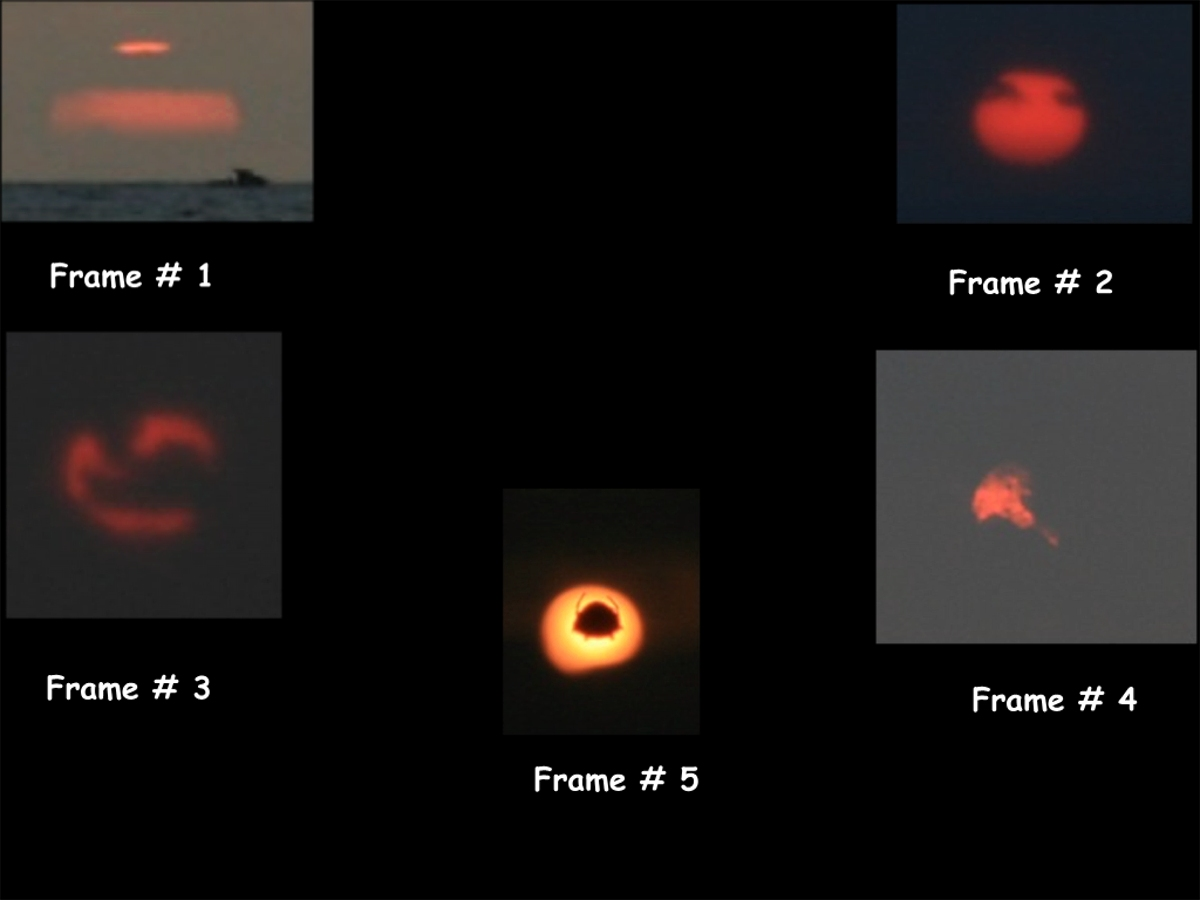
Different shapes of the setting Sun

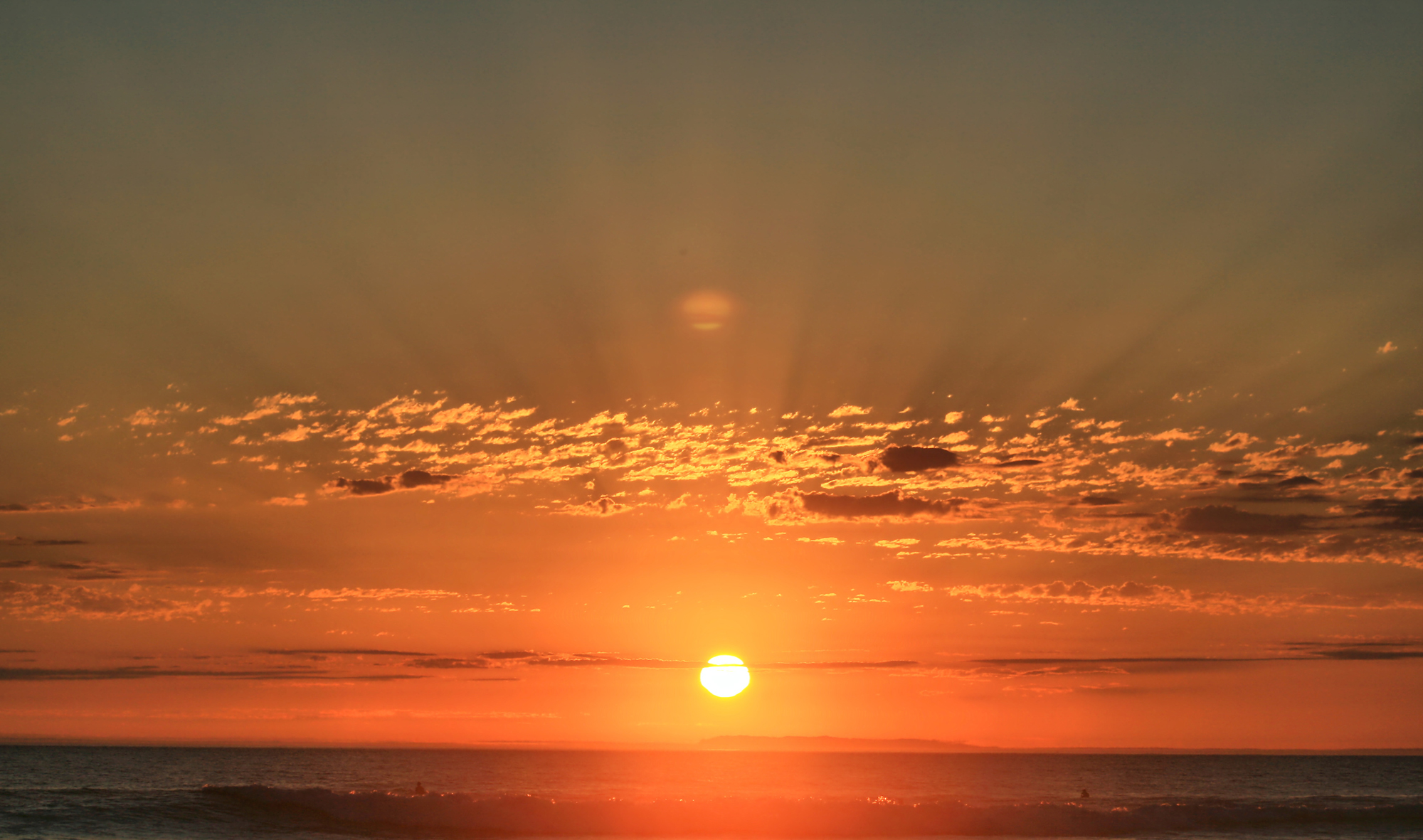
The second Sun at the image is the inter-reflection of the Sun from camera lens, and not a mirage. Note the Crepuscular rays also visible in this image

The composite image on the left is made out of five frames of different sunsets. None of the images is a mirage. Frames # 1 and # 2 could fool even a very experienced observer. They do look like a mock mirage of the setting Sun, but they are not. Frames #3 and # 4 are clearly not a mirage. Frame # 5 is not a mirage and not even a sunspot, it is a spider with the Sun as a background. The strange shapes of the Sun in this composite is due to vog and clouds.

Numerous atmospheric effects, such as vog, clouds, smoke, smog and others could generate a mirage like appearance of an astronomical object. Lens flares and ghost images also might be responsible for a false mirage or a false green flash.

== See also ==
- Gravitational lens, which is believed to cause a similarly duplicate image of galaxies
- Refraction
- Atmospheric refraction
- Looming and similar refraction phenomena

== Gallery ==
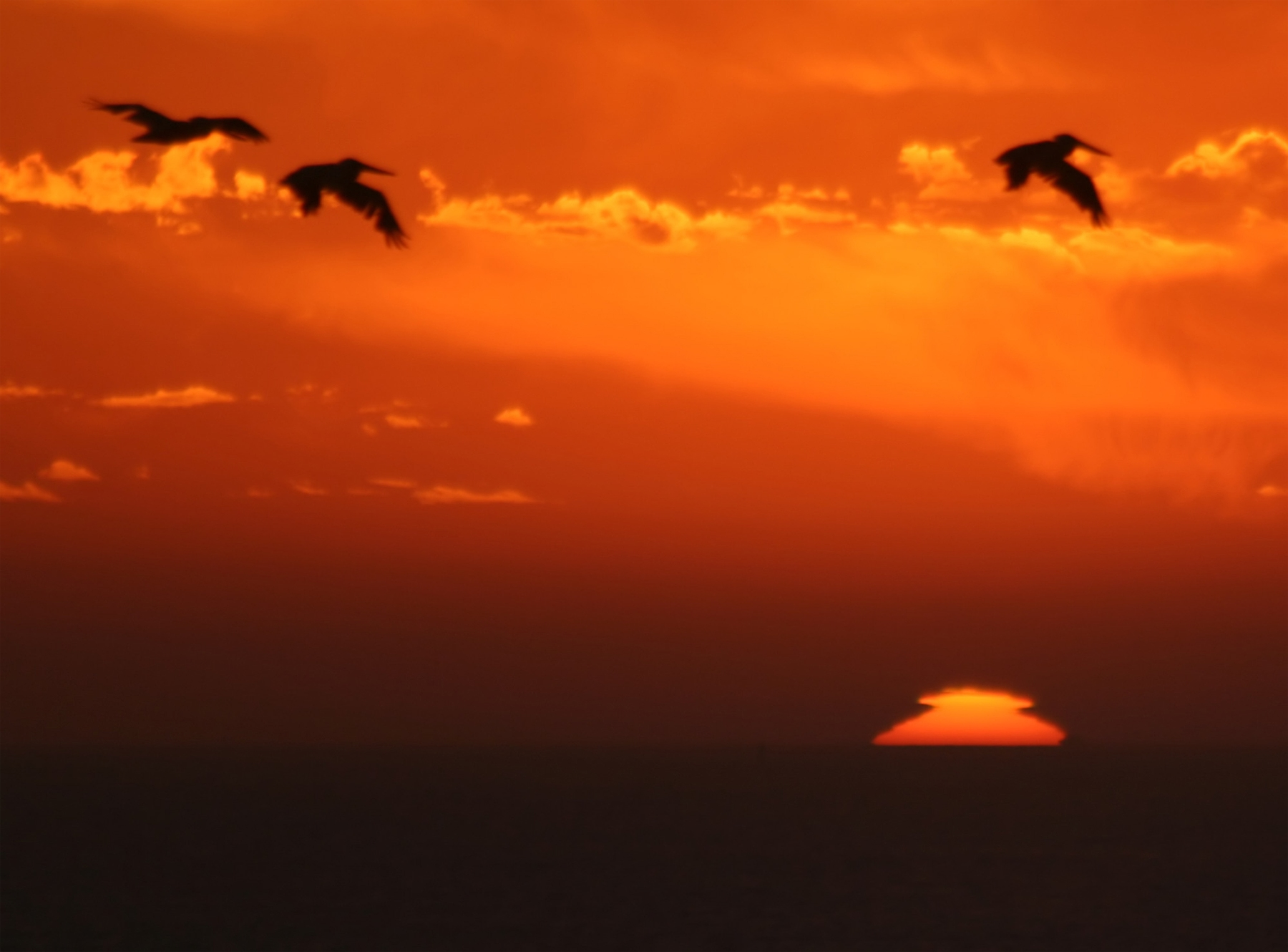
Mock mirage sunset with brown pelicans

"Boiling" sun sunset

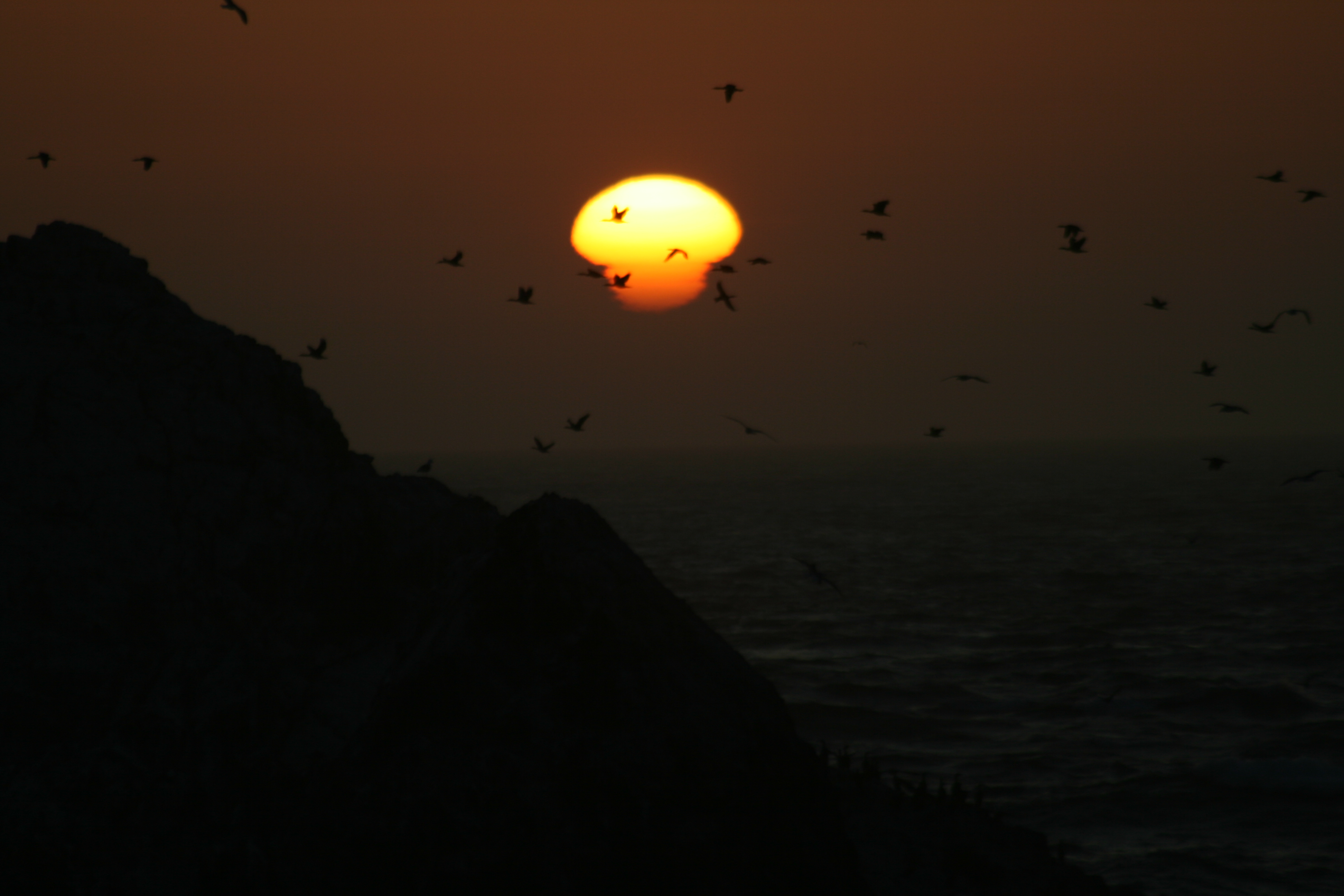
Mock mirage sunset

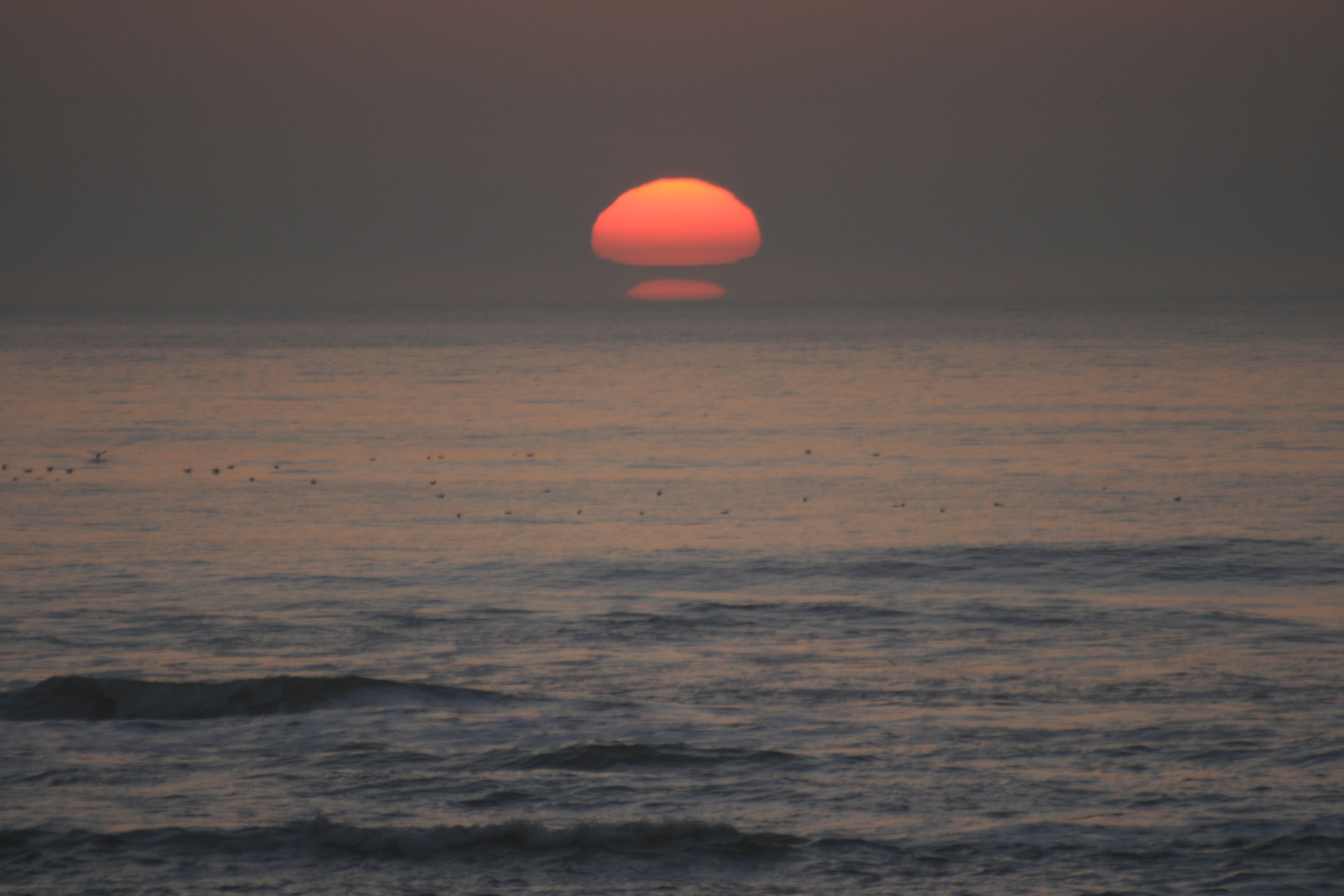
Mock mirage sunset

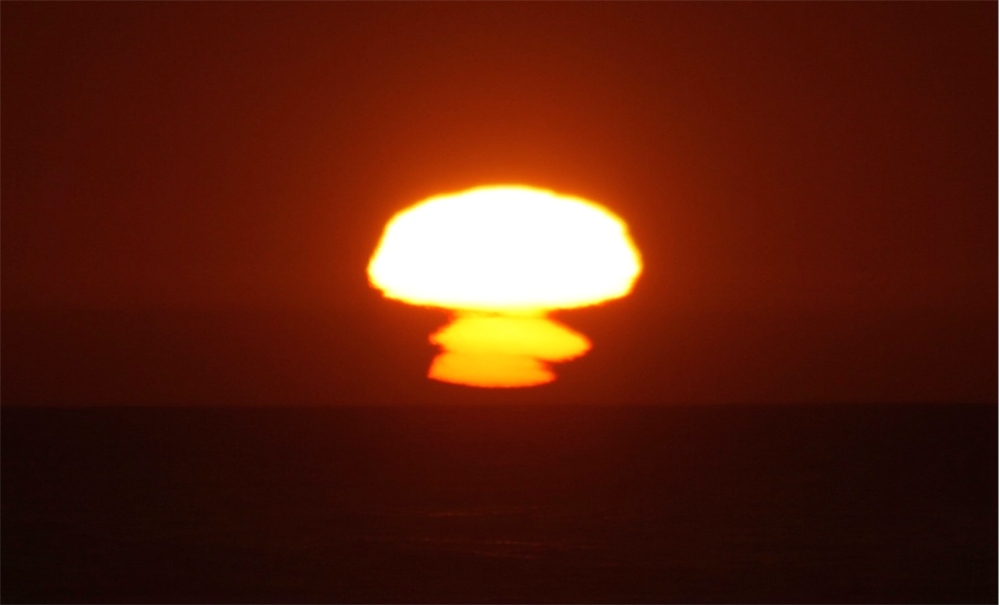
Mock mirage sunset

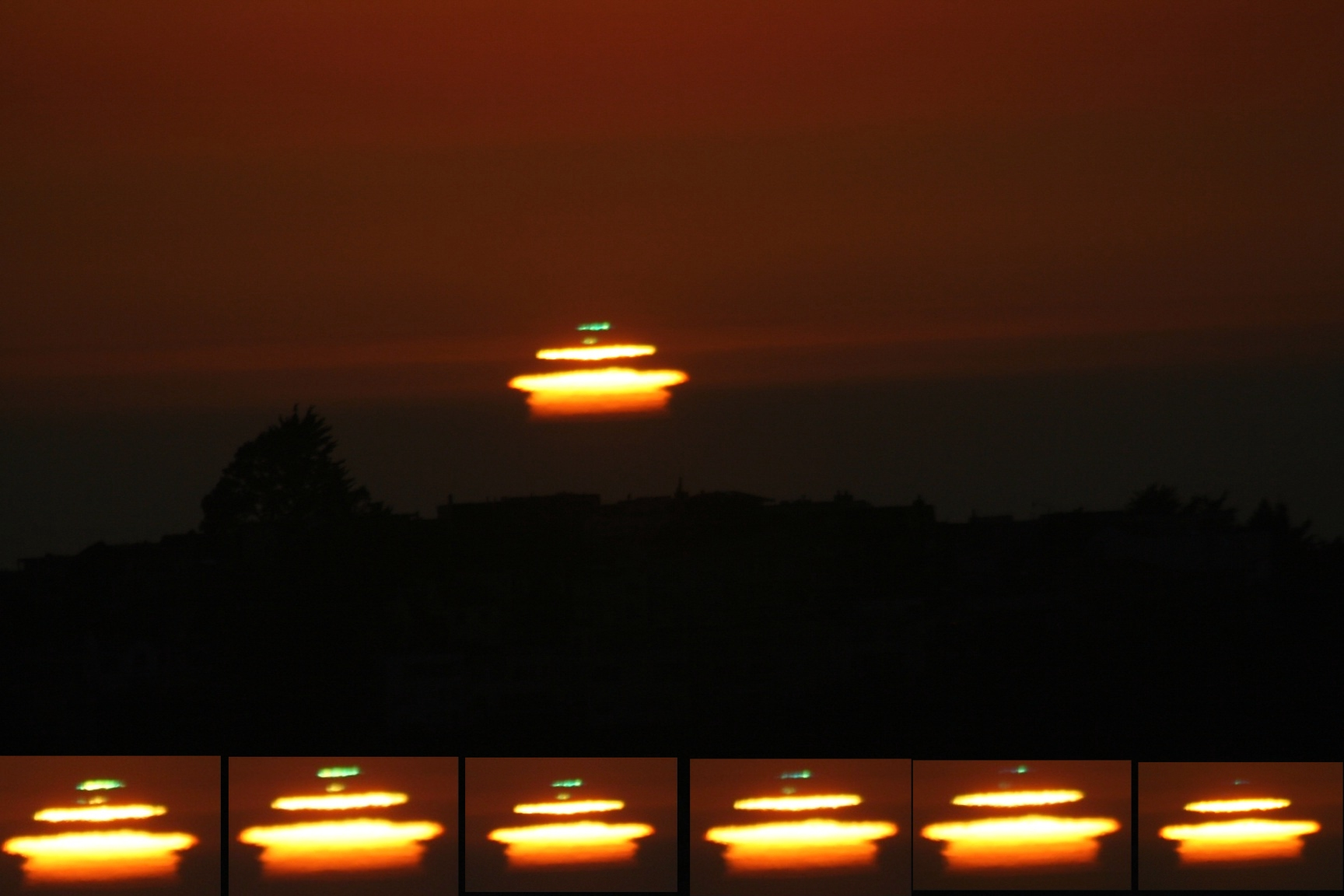
Mock mirage sunset with green flash

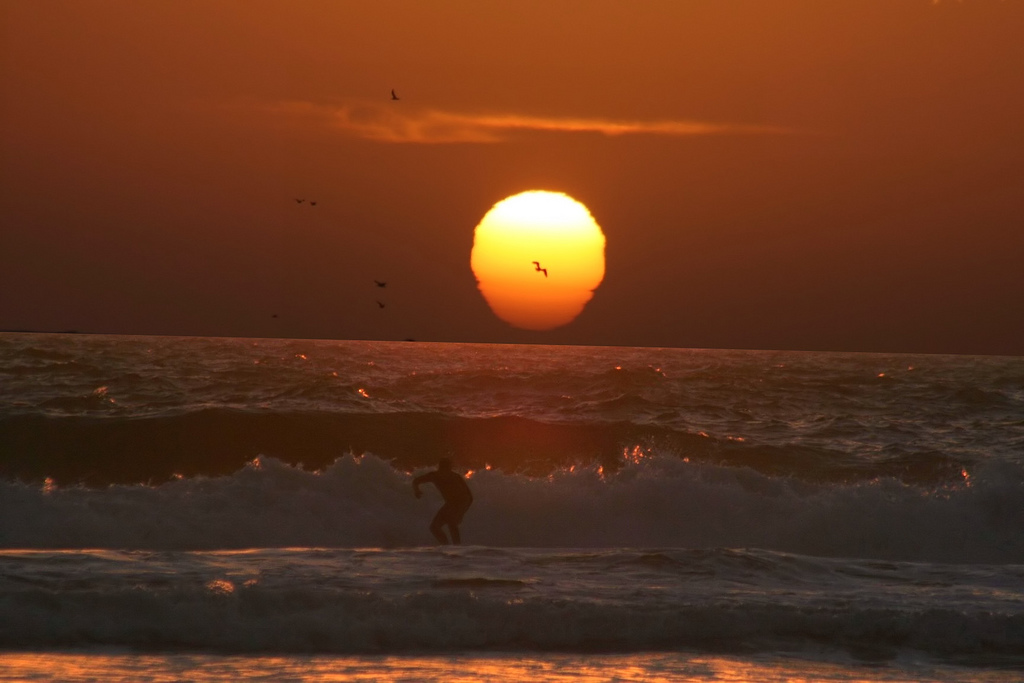
Mock mirage sunset

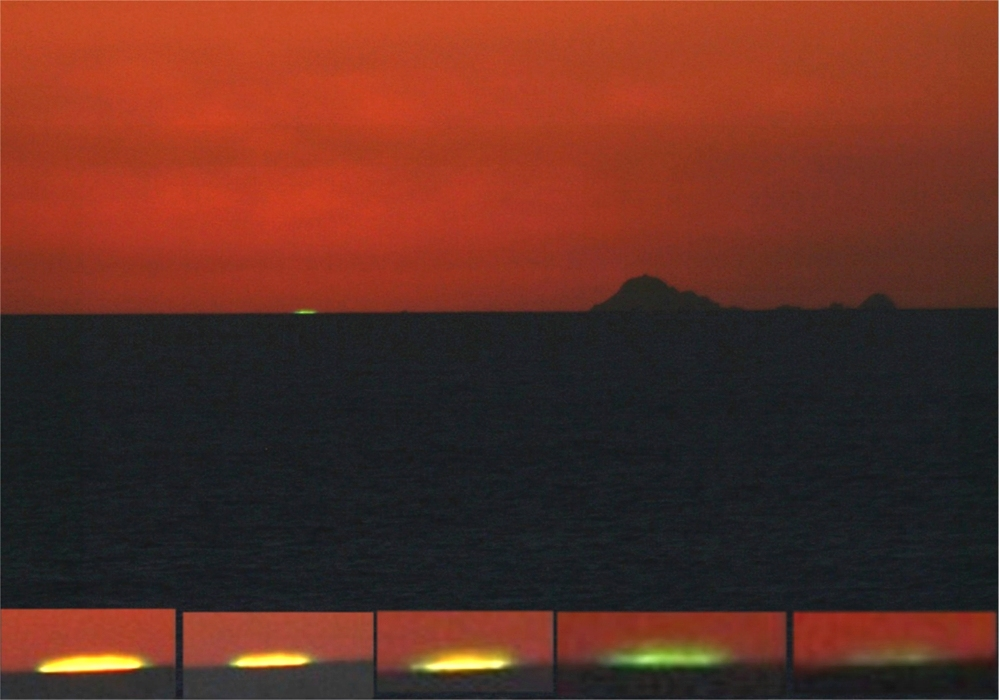
Farallon Islands and Inferior mirage green flash

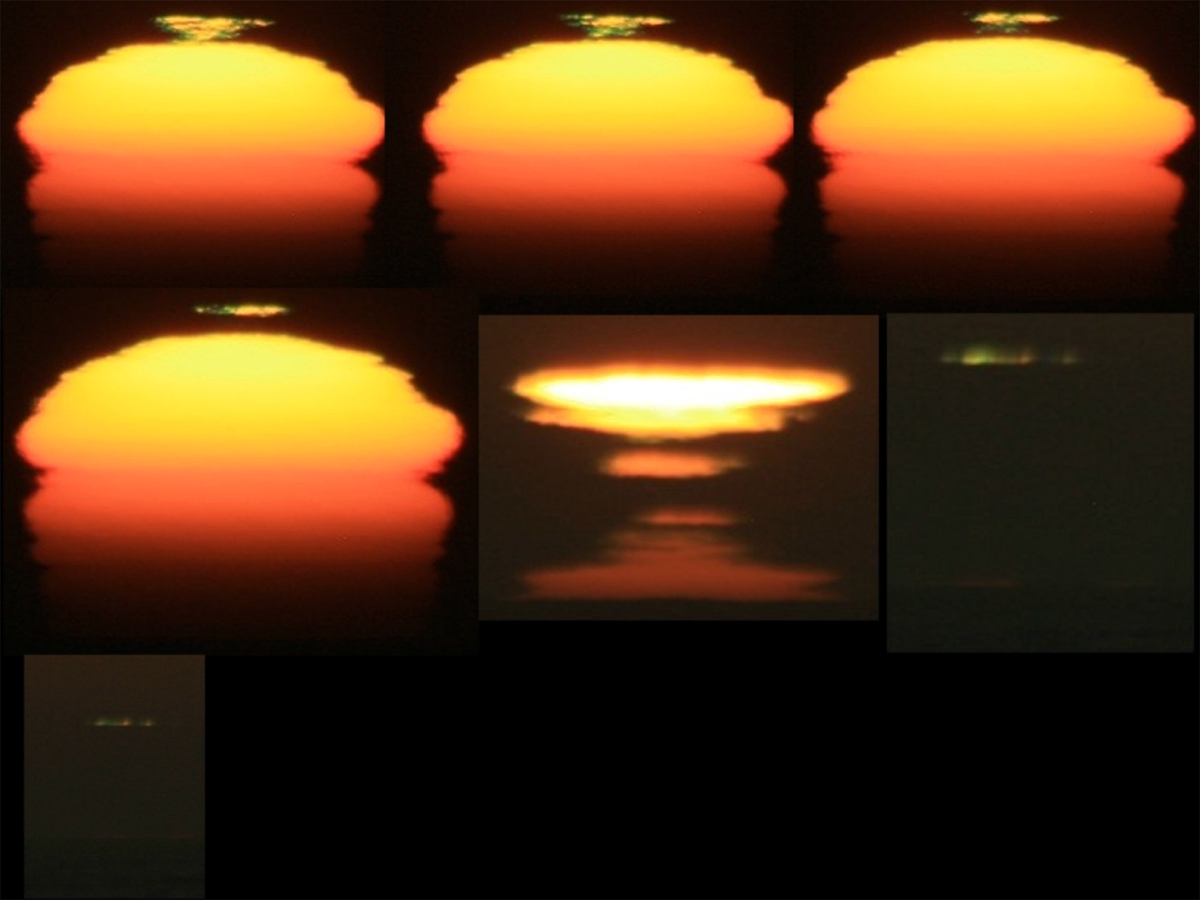
Sunset sequence with multiple green flashes
