= Green flash =

Meteorological optical phenomenon

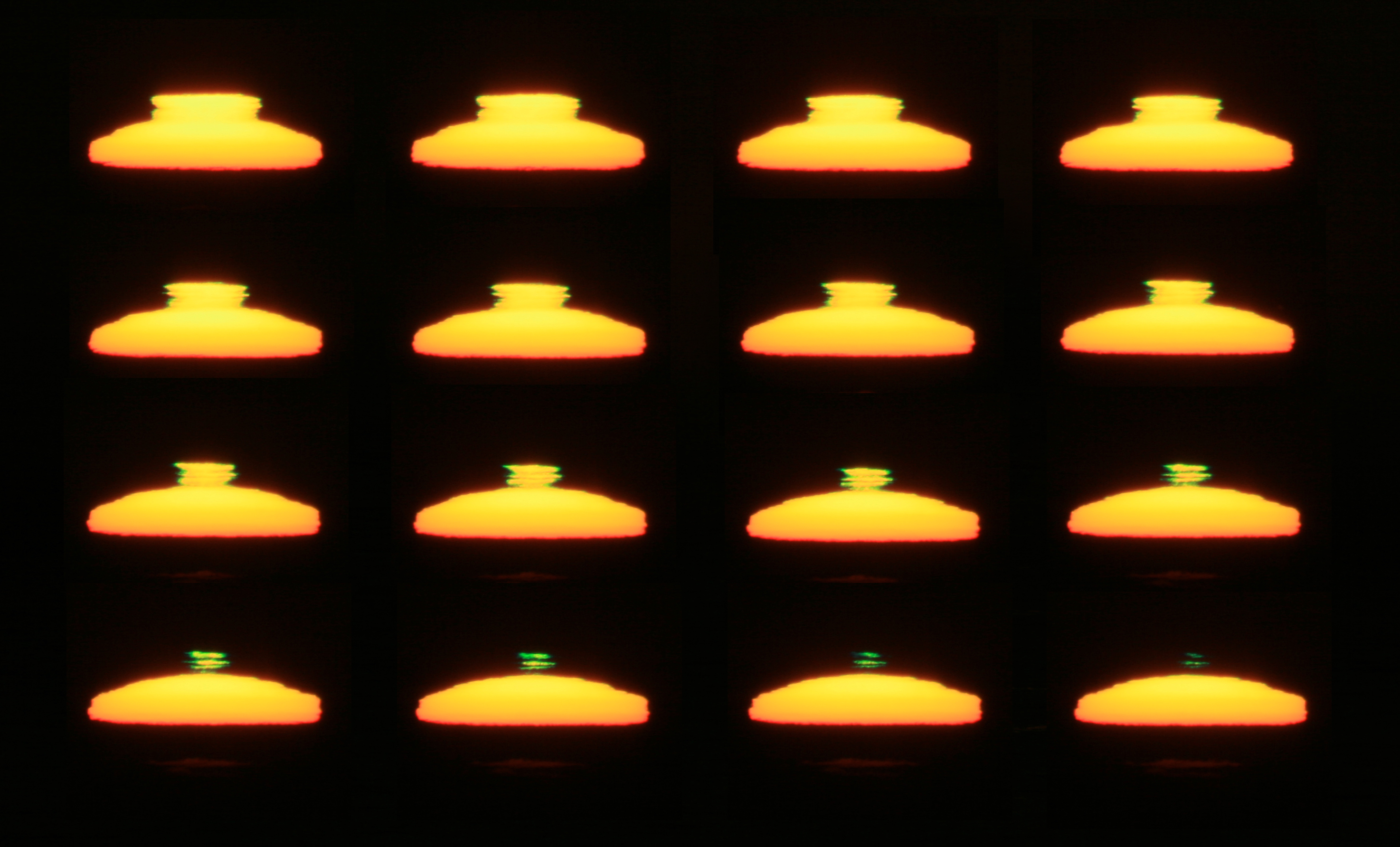
The development of a green flash at sunset in San Francisco

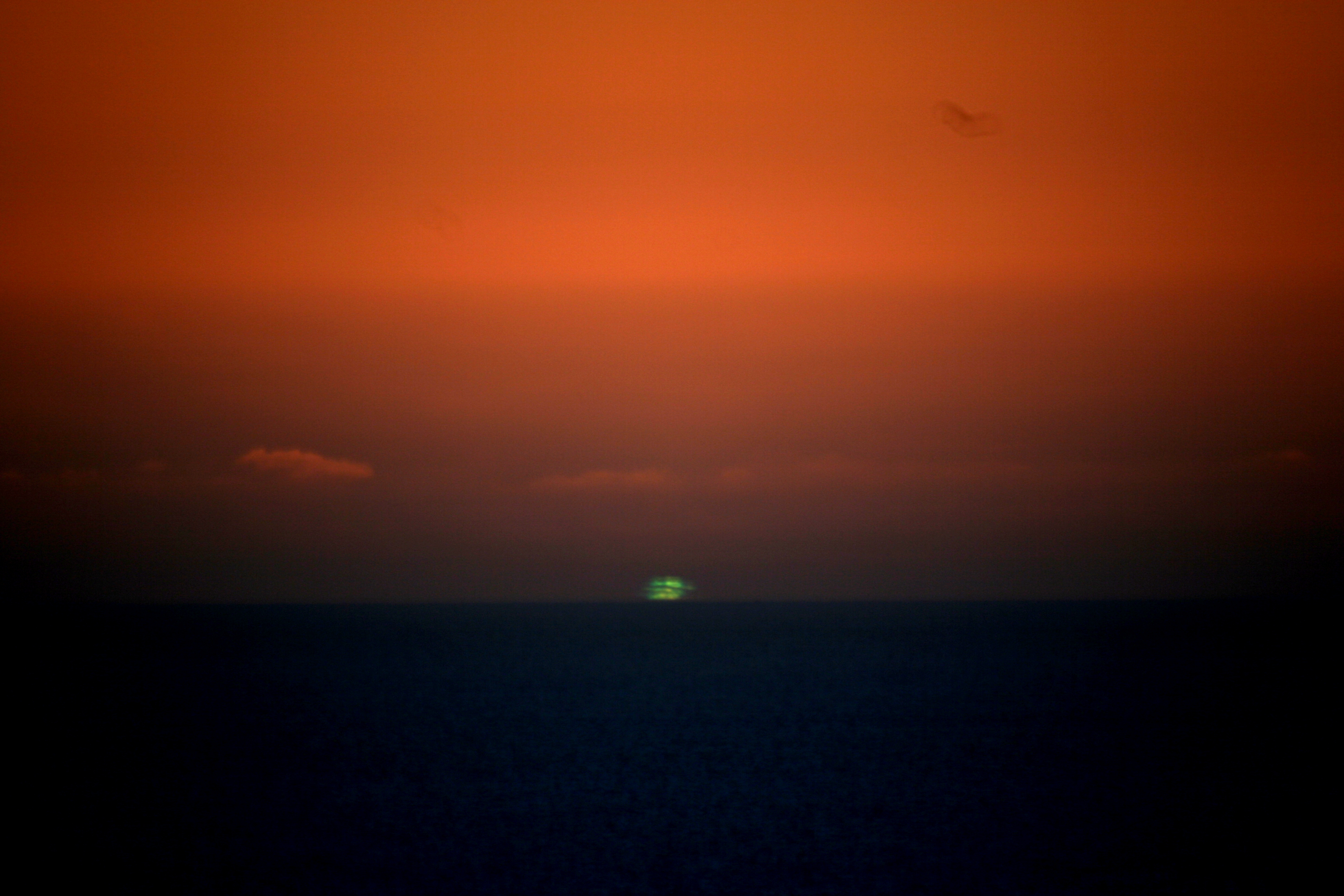
A green flash in Santa Cruz, California

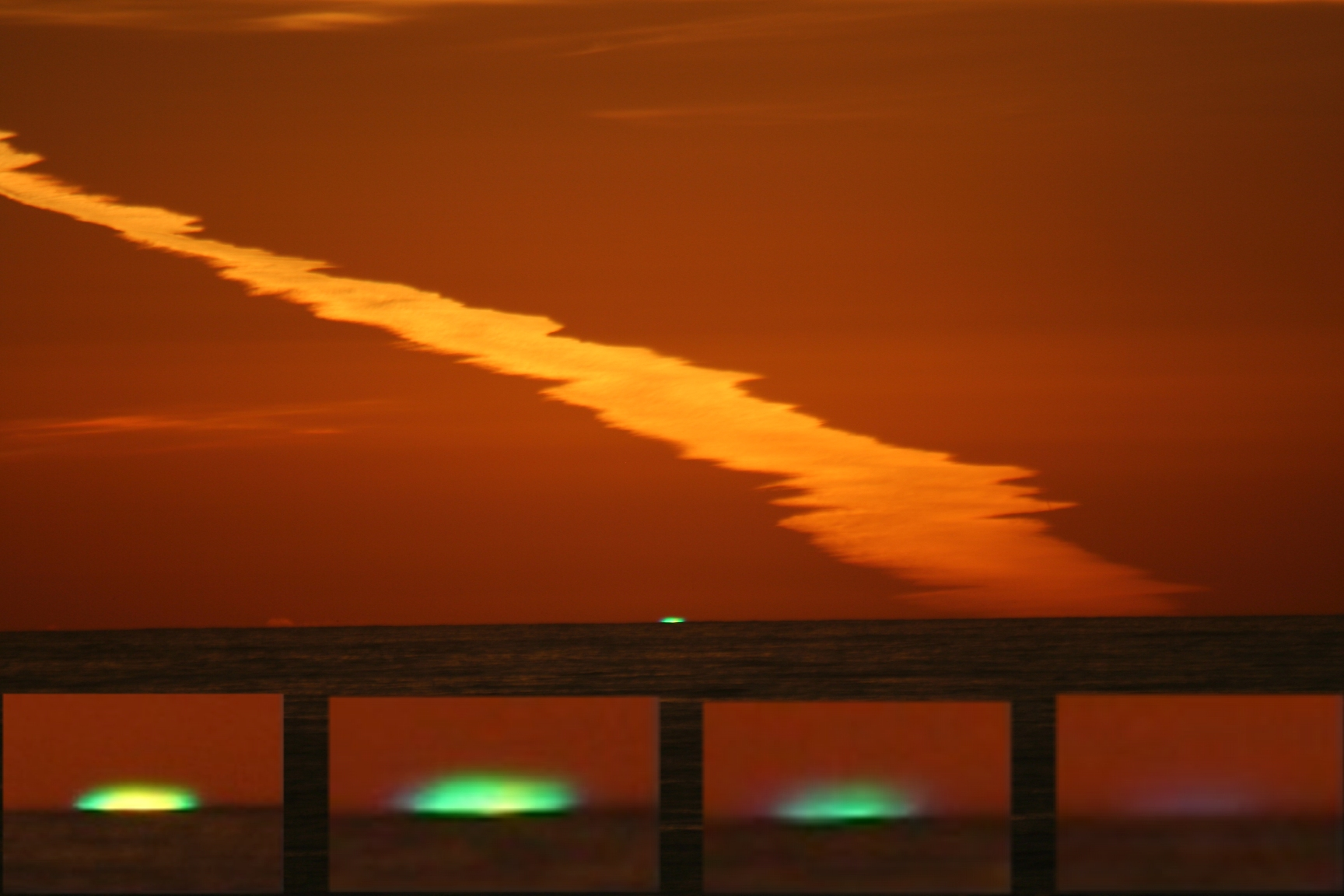
The stages of a green flash

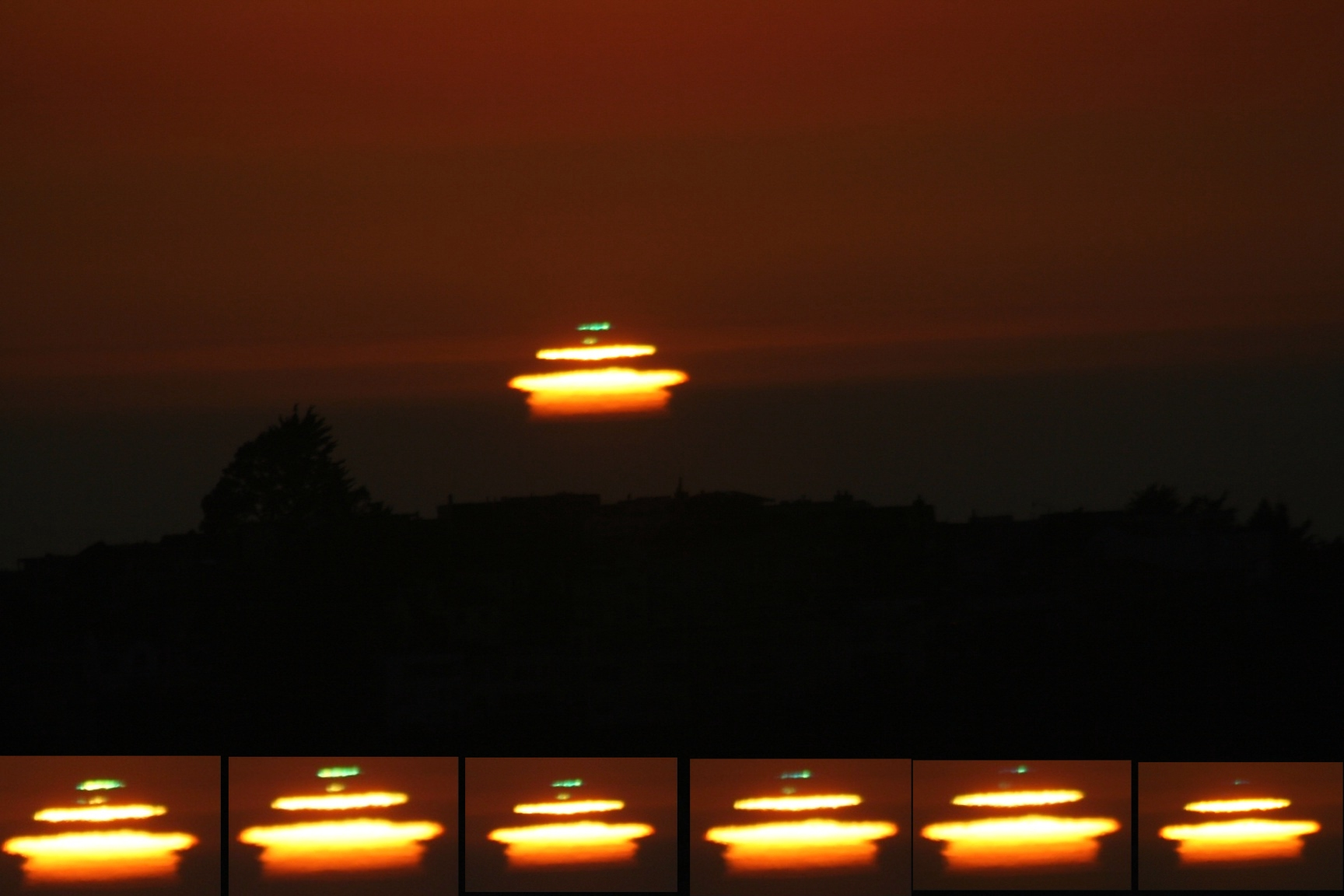
A mock-mirage green flash observed in San Francisco, California

The green flash and green ray are meteorological optical phenomena that sometimes occur transiently around the moment of sunset or sunrise. When the conditions are right, a distinct green spot is briefly visible above the Sun's upper limb; the green appearance usually lasts for no more than two seconds. Rarely, the green flash can resemble a green ray shooting up from the sunset or sunrise point.

Green flashes occur because the Earth's atmosphere can cause the light from the Sun to separate, via wavelength varying refraction, into different colors. Green flashes are a group of similar phenomena that stem from slightly different causes, and therefore, some types of green flashes are more common than others.

== Observing ==
Green flashes may be observed from any altitude. They usually are seen at an unobstructed horizon, such as over the ocean, but are possible over cloud tops and mountain tops as well. They may occur at any latitude, although at the equator, the flash rarely lasts longer than a second.

The green flash also may be observed in association with the Moon and bright planets at the horizon, including Venus and Jupiter. With an unrestricted view of the horizon, green flashes are regularly seen by airline pilots, particularly when flying westward as the sunset is slowed. If the atmosphere is layered, the green flash may appear as a series of flashes.

While observing at the Vatican Observatory in 1960, D.J.K. O'Connell produced the first color photograph of the green flash at sunset.

== Explanation ==
Green flashes occur because the atmosphere causes the light from the Sun to separate, or refract, into different frequencies. Green flashes are enhanced by mirages, which increase refraction. A green flash is more likely to be seen in stable, clear air, when more of the light from the setting sun reaches the observer without being scattered. One might expect to see a blue flash, since blue light is refracted most of all and the blue component of the sun's light is therefore the last to disappear below the horizon, but the blue is preferentially scattered out of the line of sight, and the remaining light ends up appearing green.

With slight magnification, a green rim on the top of the solar disk may be seen on most clear-day sunsets, although the flash or ray effects require a stronger layering of the atmosphere and a mirage, which serves to magnify the green from a fraction of a second to a couple of seconds.

== Types ==
The "green flash" description relates to a group of optical phenomena, some of which are listed below:

Type	Characteristics	Conditions	Best seen from
Inferior‑mirage flash	James Prescott Joule's "last glimpse"; oval, flattened below; lasts 1 or 2 seconds	Surface warmer than the overlying air	Close to sea level
Mock‑mirage flash	Indentations seem to "pinch off" a thin, pointy strip from the upper rim of the Sun; lasts 1 or 2 seconds	Atmospheric inversion layer below eye level; surface colder than air	The higher the eye, the more likely; flash is most obvious when the eye is just above the inversion.
Sub‑duct flash	Large upper part of an hourglass-shaped Sun turns green for up to 15 seconds;	Observer below a strong atmospheric inversion	In a narrow height interval just below a duct (can occur at any height)
Green ray	Green beam of light either shooting up or seen immediately after sundown; usually a few degrees long, lasting several seconds	Hazy air and a bright green flash acting as a light source	Sea level

The majority of flashes observed are inferior-mirage or mock-mirage effects, with the others constituting only 1% of reports. Some types not listed in the table above, such as the cloud-top flash (seen as the Sun sinks into a coastal fog, or at distant cumulus clouds), are not understood.

James Prescott Joule has been attributed with explaining the sunset green flash phenomenon in a letter to the Manchester Literary and Philosophical Society in 1869; actually, he noted the last glimpse as bluish green, without attempting to explain the phenomenon.

=== Blue flashes ===
On rare occasion, the amount of blue light is sufficient to be visible as a "blue flash".

Blue flash of Venus in the Austrian Alps

=== Green rim ===
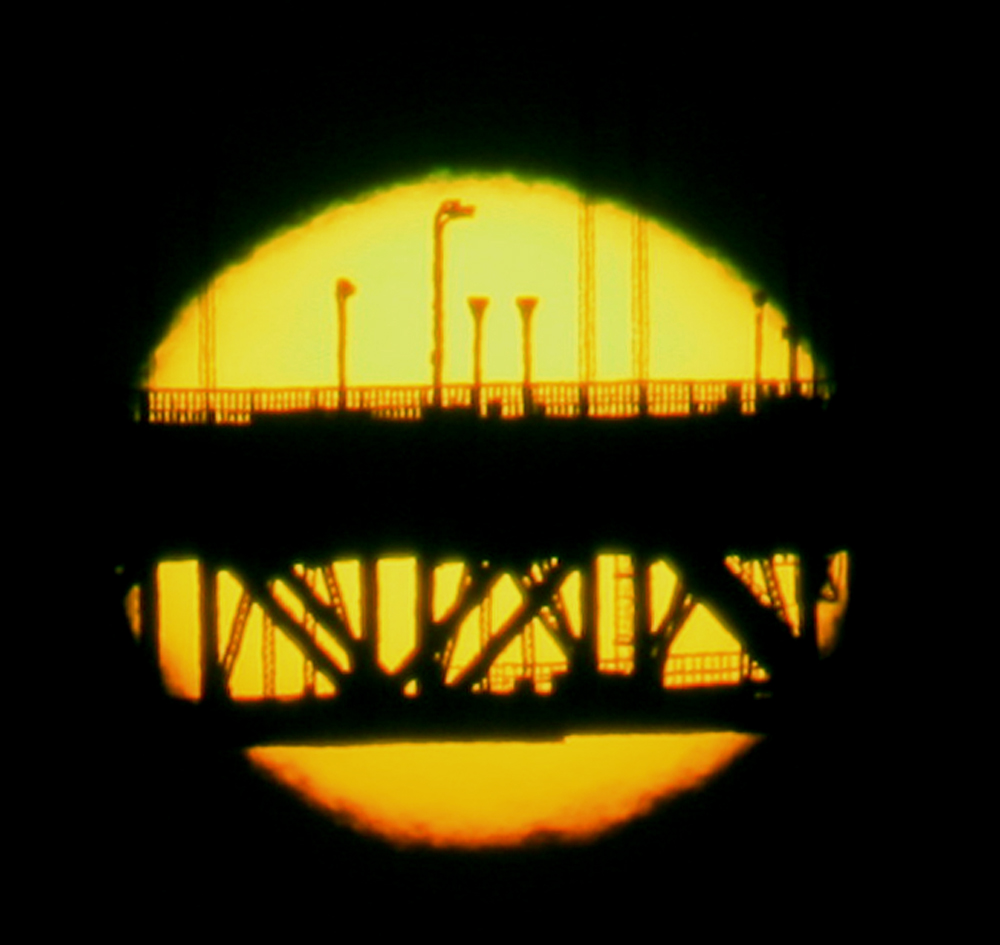
The upper rim is green while the lower one is red, as the sun sets behind the Golden Gate Bridge

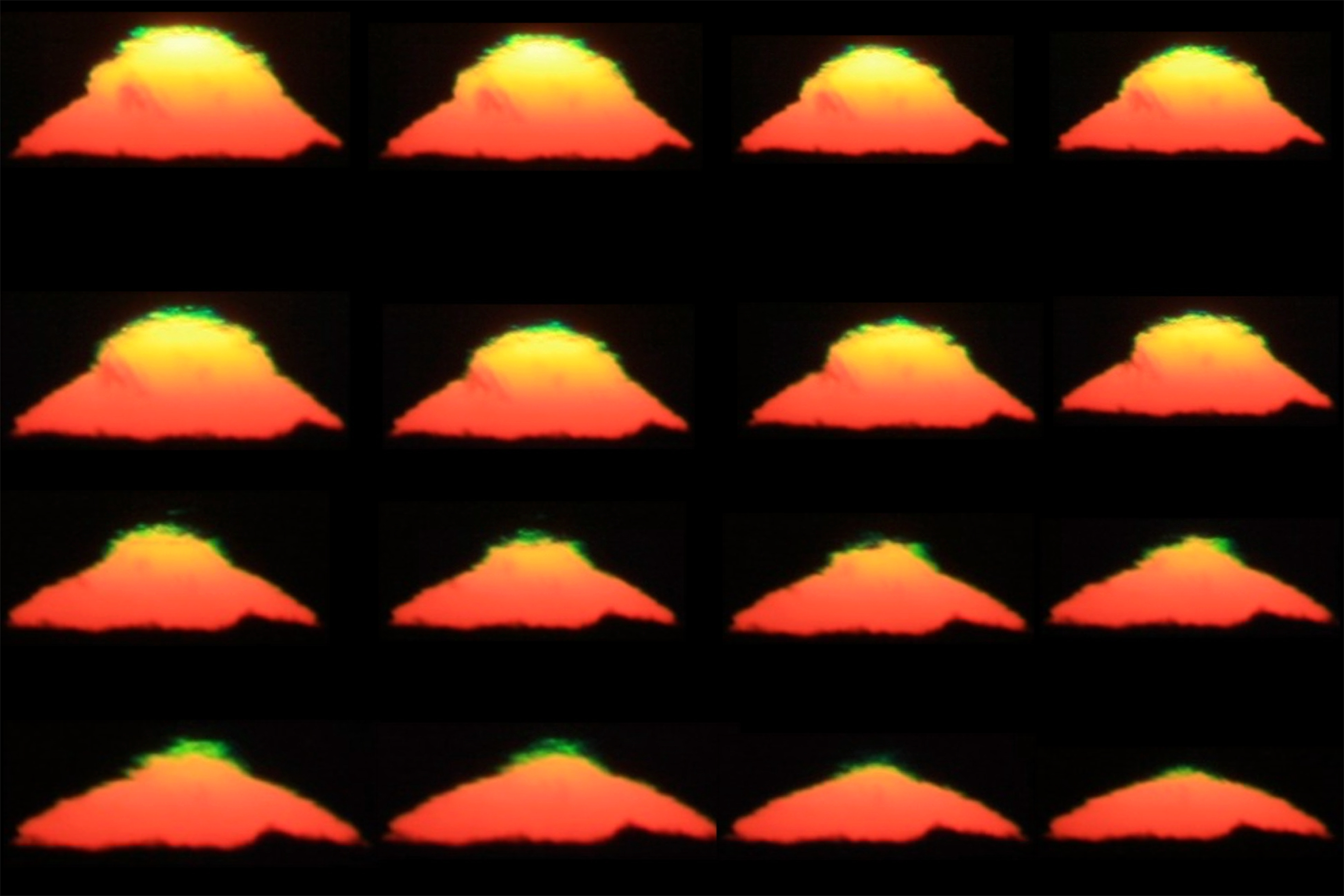
The green rim and flashes of a setting sun

As an astronomical object sets or rises in relation to the horizon, the light it emits travels through Earth's atmosphere, which works as a prism separating the light into different colors. The color of the upper rim of an astronomical object could go from green to blue to violet depending on the decrease in concentration of pollutants as they spread throughout an increasing volume of atmosphere. The lower rim of an astronomical object is always red. A green rim is very thin and is difficult or impossible to see with the naked eye. In usual conditions, a green rim of an astronomical object gets fainter when an astronomical object is very low above the horizon because of atmospheric reddening, but sometimes the conditions are right to see a green rim just above the horizon.

The following quote describes what was probably the longest observation of a green rim, which at times could have been a green flash. It was seen on and off for 35 minutes by members of the Richard Evelyn Byrd party from the Antarctic Little America exploration base in 1934:

There was a rush for the surface and as eyes turned southward, they saw a tiny but brilliant green spot where the last ray of the upper rim of the sun hung on the skyline. It lasted an appreciable length of time, several seconds at least, and no sooner disappeared than it flashed forth again. Altogether it remained on the horizon with short interruptions for thirty-five minutes.
When it disappeared momentarily it seemed to have been shut off by a tiny spurt, an inequality in the skyline caused by the barrier surface.
Even by moving the head up a few inches it would disappear and reappear again and after it had finally disappeared from view it could be recaptured by climbing up the first few steps of the antanea [sic] post.

For the explorers to have seen a green rim on and off for 35 minutes, there must have been some mirage effect present.

A green rim is present at every sunset, but it is too thin to be seen with the naked eye. Often a green rim changes to a green flash and back again during the same sunset. The best time to observe a green rim is about 10 minutes before sunset. That is too early to use any magnification like binoculars or a telescope to look directly at the Sun without potential harm to the eyes (instead, a magnified image might be projected onto a sheet of paper for safe viewing). As the Sun gets closer to the horizon, the green rim becomes fainter due to atmospheric reddening. According to the above, it is probably correct to conclude that although a green rim is present during every sunset, a green flash is rarer because of the required mirage.

== In popular culture ==
Jules Verne's 1882 novel The Green Ray helped to popularize the green flash phenomenon.

Joan Aiken's 1971 short story collection The Green Flash and Other Tales of Horror, Suspense and Fantasy is a U.S. variation on a 1969 U.K.volume, The Windscreen Weepers and Other Stories of Horror and Suspense, which was the first publication site of her story "The Green Flash". The green flash's relevance to sundown is key to the story.

The disappearance of an opal, named the "Green Flash at Sunset" for the scientific phenomenon, forms a significant point plot in Victoria Holt's 1976 novel The Pride of the Peacock. The actual phenomenon is referenced several times in the text.

In the 1984 film The Island Closest to Heaven, Yuichi Fukaya takes Mari, the main character, to watch the sunset and tells her about the green flash after the sun sinks into the sea. According to him, those people who see it can find what they are looking for.

In Éric Rohmer's 1986 film The Green Ray (French: Le rayon vert), the main character, Delphine, eavesdrops on a conversation about Jules Verne's novel and the significance of the green flash, eventually witnessing the phenomenon herself in the final scene.

Walt Disney Pictures' 2007 movie Pirates of the Caribbean: At World's End references the green flash as a signal that a soul had returned from the dead.

The episode "Trials and Determinations!" of Pokémon the Series: Sun & Moon references the green flash when Ash's Rockruff evolves into Dusk Form Lycanroc after witnessing a green flash at sunset.

In 2025, the film Dora and the Search for Sol Dorado depicted the green flash, as a signal one believes is given by his closed one after death. Dora waits for her grandfather's signal, and she finally sees it one day after her successful adventure, prompting another adventure.

In Nathan Fielder's 2026 documentary film You Can See Everything, the main subjects, Elizabeth Holmes and her partner Billy Evans, watch a sunset in San Diego and audibly remark about seeing the green flash. The green flash is not observed by the viewer.

== See also ==
- Mirage of astronomical objects
- Crown flash
- Fogbow
