= List of American artists 1900 and after =

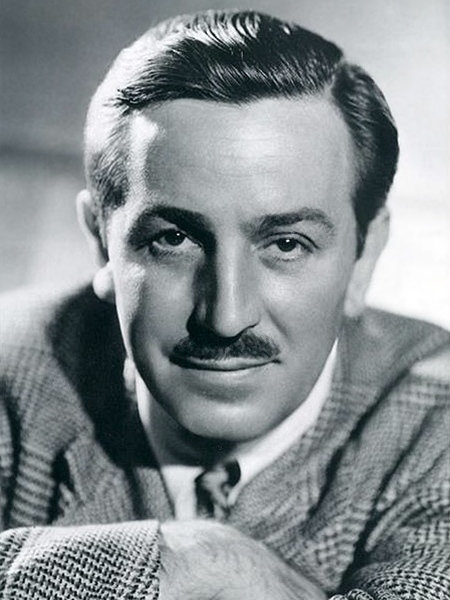
Walt Disney (1901–1966), co-founder of Walt Disney Studio, is widely considered a pioneer of American animation.

This is a list by date of birth of historically recognized fine artists from the United States known for the creation of artworks that are primarily visual in nature, including traditional media such as painting, sculpture, photography, and printmaking, as well as more recent genres, including installation art, performance art, body art, conceptual art, digital art, and video art.

== Born 1900–1909 ==
=== 1900 ===
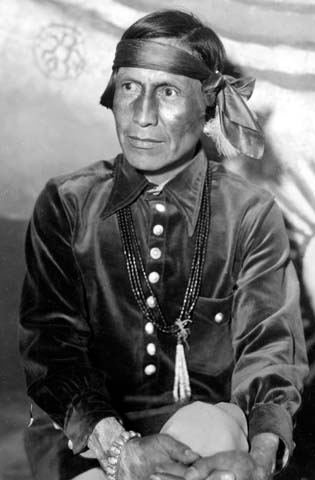
Fred Kabotie (1900–1986)

- Samuel Cashwan (d. 1988), sculptor
- Carl Holty (d. 1973), painter
- Fred Kabotie (d. 1986), painter, silversmith
- Rico Lebrun (d. 1964), painter
- Fannie Nampeyo (d. 1987), potter, ceramist
- Alice Neel (d. 1984), painter
- Betty Parsons (d. 1982), painter, gallerist
- Virginia True (d. 1989), painter
- Jack Tworkov (d. 1982), painter
- Adja Yunkers (d. 1983), Russian-born painter

=== 1901 ===
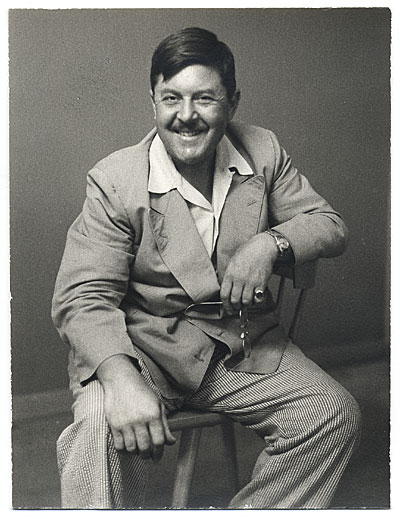
Philip Evergood (1901–1973)

- James Richmond Barthé (d. 1989), sculptor
- Francis Criss (d. 1973), painter
- Dorothy Dehner (d. 1994), sculptor, printmaker
- Beauford Delaney (d. 1979), painter
- Walt Disney (d. 1966), cartoonist, animator, filmmaker
- Philip Evergood (d. 1973), painter, printmaker, sculptor
- Greta Kempton (d. 1991), portrait artist
- Richard Lindner (d. 1978), painter
- Louise Emerson Ronnebeck (d. 1980), painter
- Esther Rose (d. 1990), painter, calligrapher
- Albert Swinden (d. 1961), painter
- John Augustus Walker (d. 1967), painter
- Elof Wedin (d. 1983), artist

=== 1902 ===
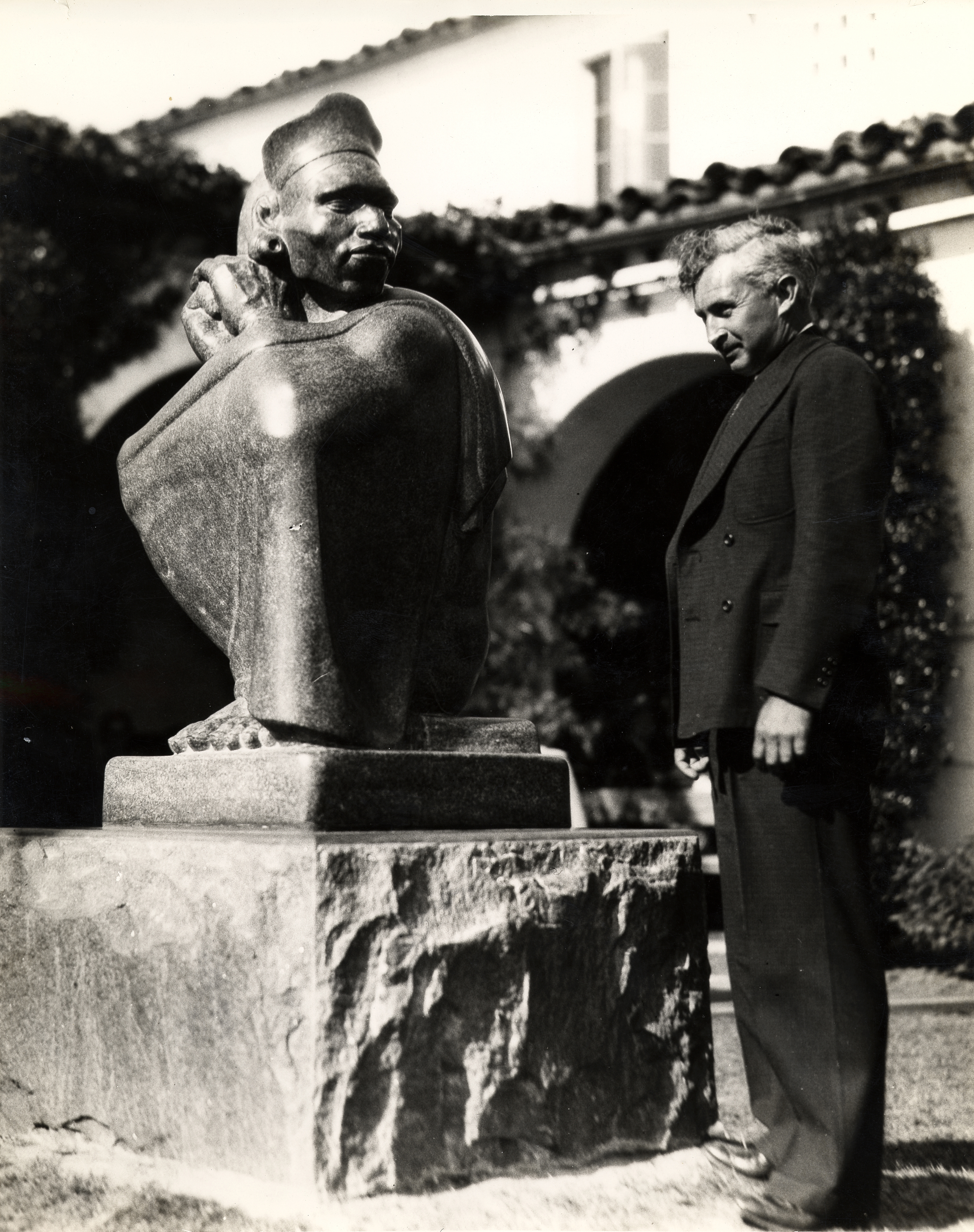
Donal Hord (1902–1966)

- Ansel Easton Adams (d. 1984), photographer
- Isabel Bishop (d. 1988), painter, printmaker
- Dorr Bothwell (d. 2000), painter, printmaker
- Alexander Cañedo (d. 1978), surrealism, magic realism
- Roger Wilson Dennis (d. 1996), painter, art conservator
- Lee Gatch (d. 1968), painter, muralist
- Donal Hord (d. 1966), sculptor
- Paul Kelpe (d. 1985), painter
- Kenzo Okada (d. 1982), painter
- I. Rice Pereira (d. 1971), painter
- Pietro Pezzati (d. 1993), painter
- Otis Polelonema (d. 1981), painter, illustrator
- Charles Pollock (d. 1988), painter
- Isaac Soyer (d. 1981), painter
- Mary Yancey (d. 1992), ceramist

=== 1903 ===
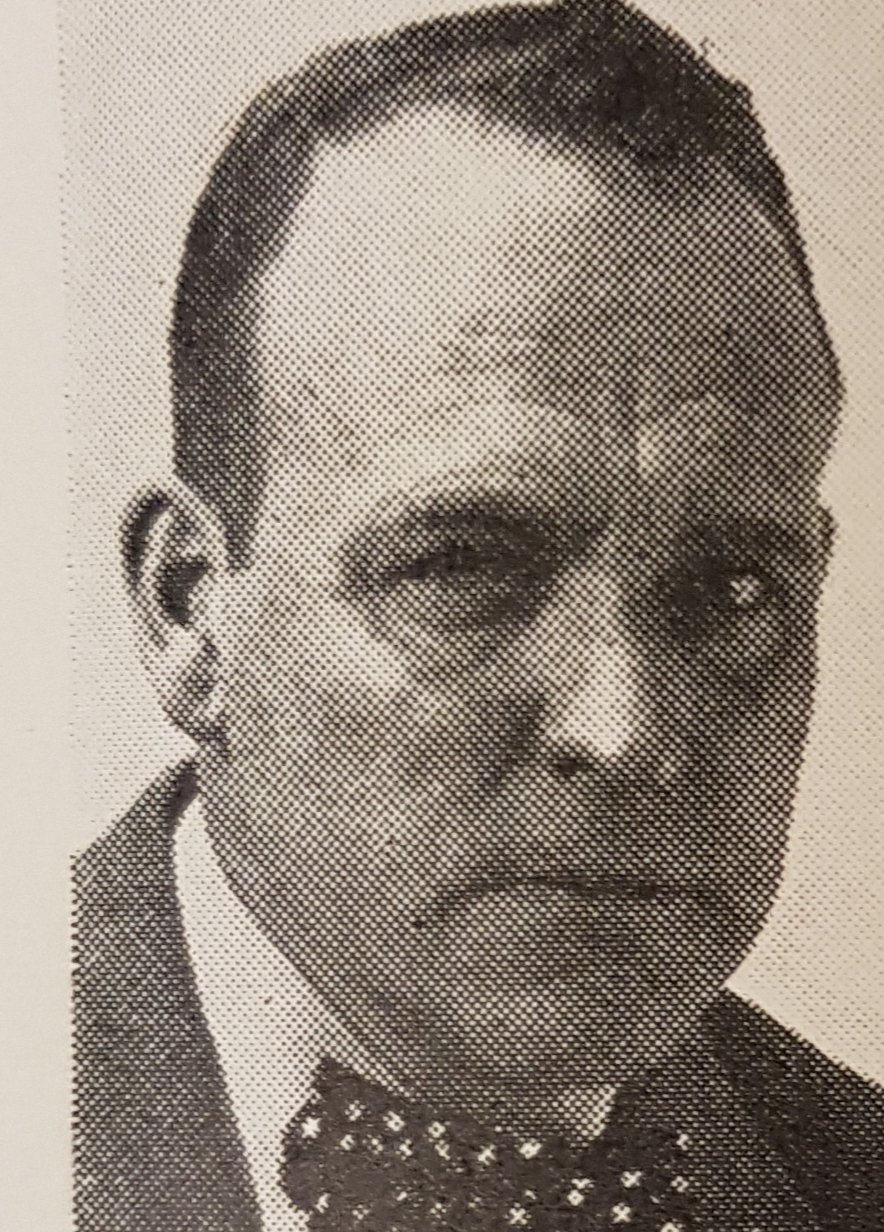
Tore Asplund (1903–1977)

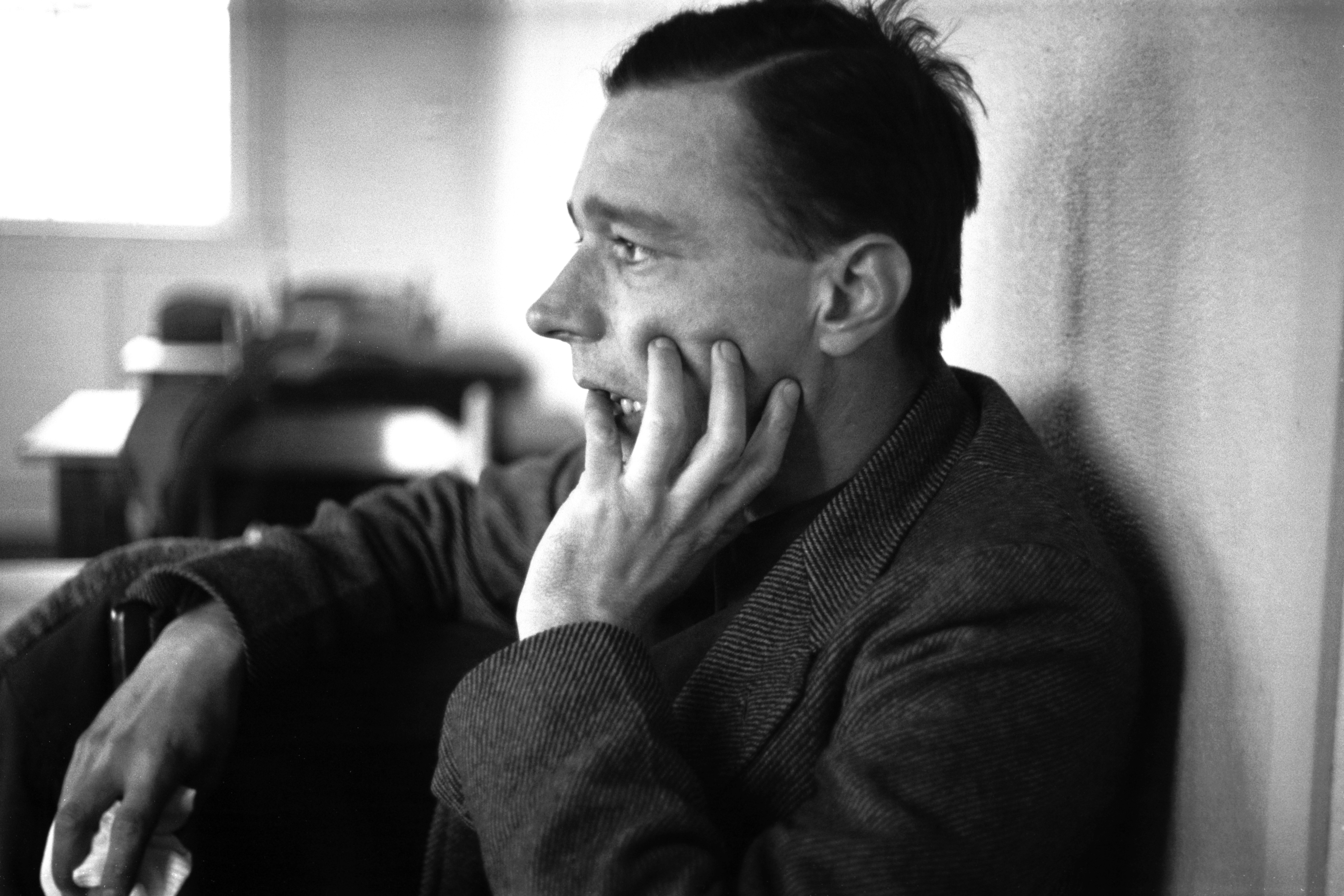
Walker Evans (1903–1975)

- Maxine Albro (d. 1966), painter, muralist, lithographer, mosaic artist, sculptor
- Walter Inglis Anderson (d. 1965), painter
- Tore Asplund (d. 1977), Swedish-born painter, watercolorist
- Joseph Cornell (d. 1972), sculptor, filmmaker
- Vestie Davis (d. 1978), self-taught artist
- Elwood Decker (d. 1992), painter
- Thomas Brownell Eldred (d. 1993), painter, printmaker
- Stephen Etnier (d. 1984), painter
- Walker Evans (d. 1975), photographer
- Adolph Gottlieb (d. 1974), painter
- Robert Gwathmey (d. 1988), painter
- Al Hirschfeld (d. 2003), caricaturist
- Leon Karp (d. 1951), painter, printmaker
- Seymour Lipton (d. 1986), sculptor
- Charles S. Martz (d. 1966), painter, photographer
- Mark Rothko (d. 1970), painter
- Louis Schanker (d. 1981), painter
- Ethel Schwabacher (d. 1984), painter
- Bernarda Bryson Shahn (d. 2004), painter, lithographer
- Karl Zerbe (d. 1972), painter

=== 1904 ===
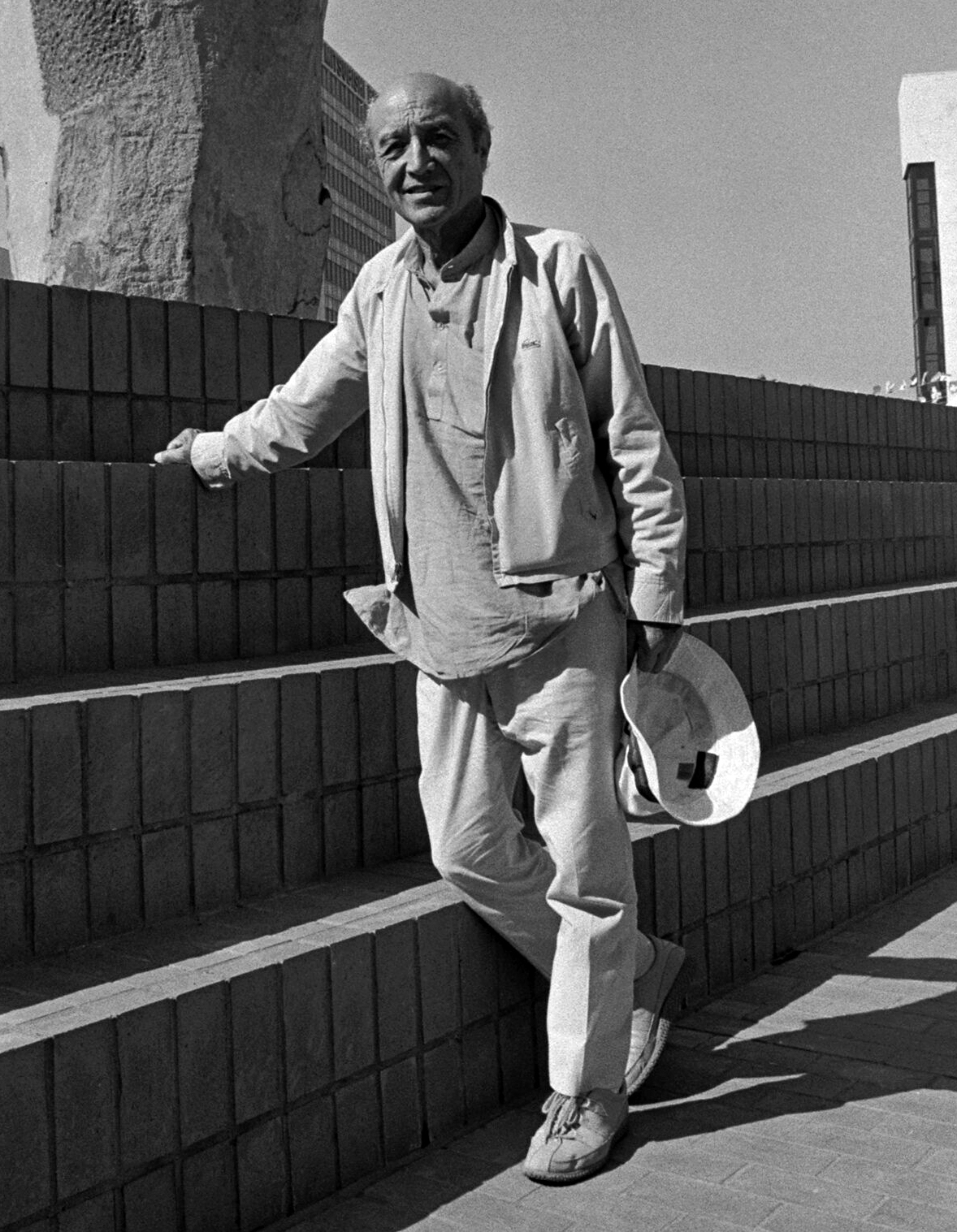
Isamu Noguchi (1904–1988)

- Margaret Bourke-White (d. 1971), photographer
- Hans Burkhardt (d. 1994), painter
- Paul Cadmus (d. 1999), painter, printmaker
- Clarence Holbrook Carter (d. 2000), painter
- Arshile Gorky (d. 1948), painter
- Chaim Gross (d. 1991), sculptor
- Murray Hantman (d. 1999), painter, muralist
- Peter Hurd (d. 1984), painter
- Willem de Kooning (d. 1997), painter
- Fletcher Martin (d. 1979), painter
- Isamu Noguchi (d. 1988), sculptor
- Nan Phelps (d. 1990), painter
- Jose de Rivera (d. 1985), sculptor
- Clyfford Still (d. 1980), painter

=== 1905 ===
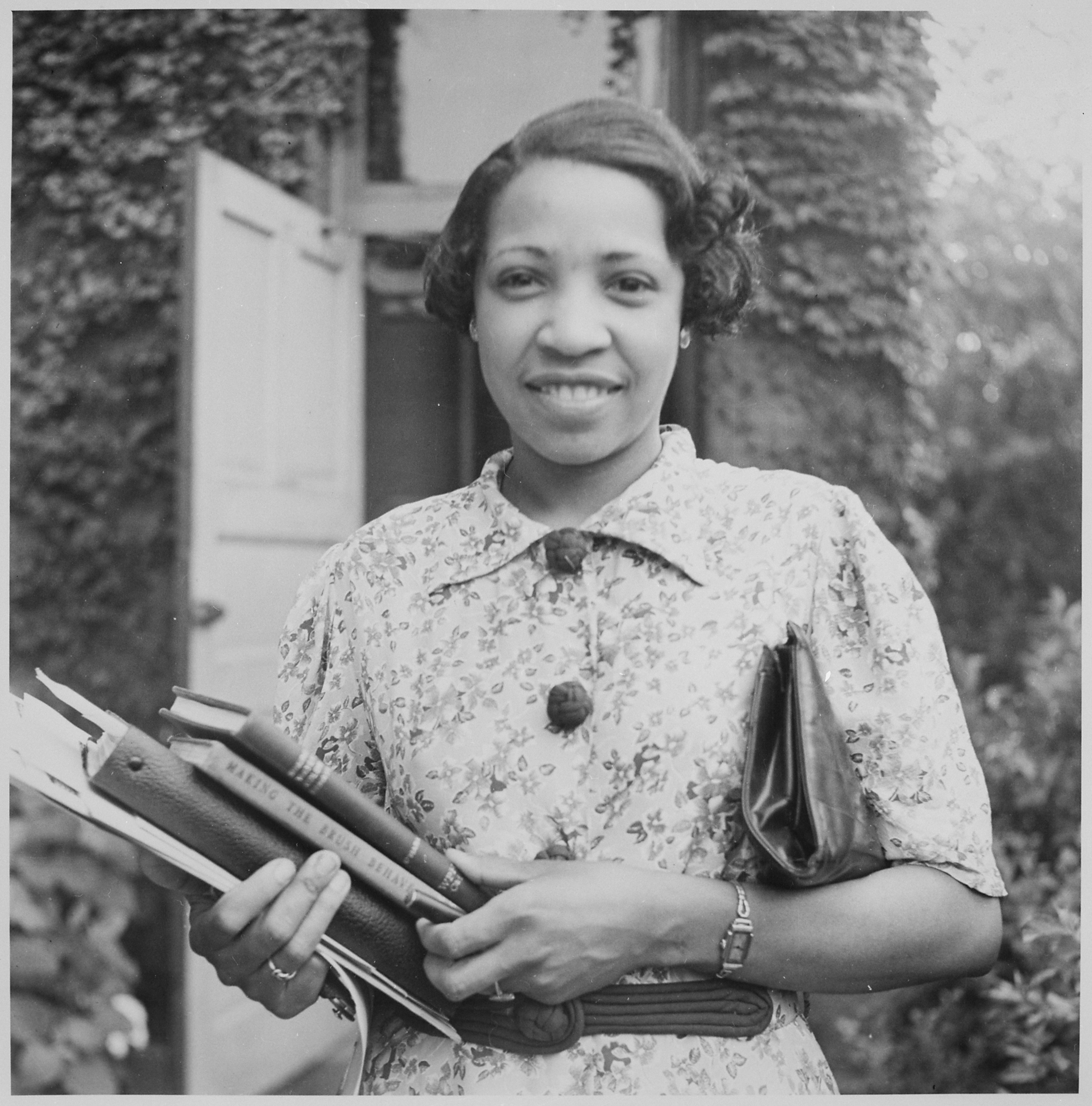
Lois Mailou Jones (1905–1998)

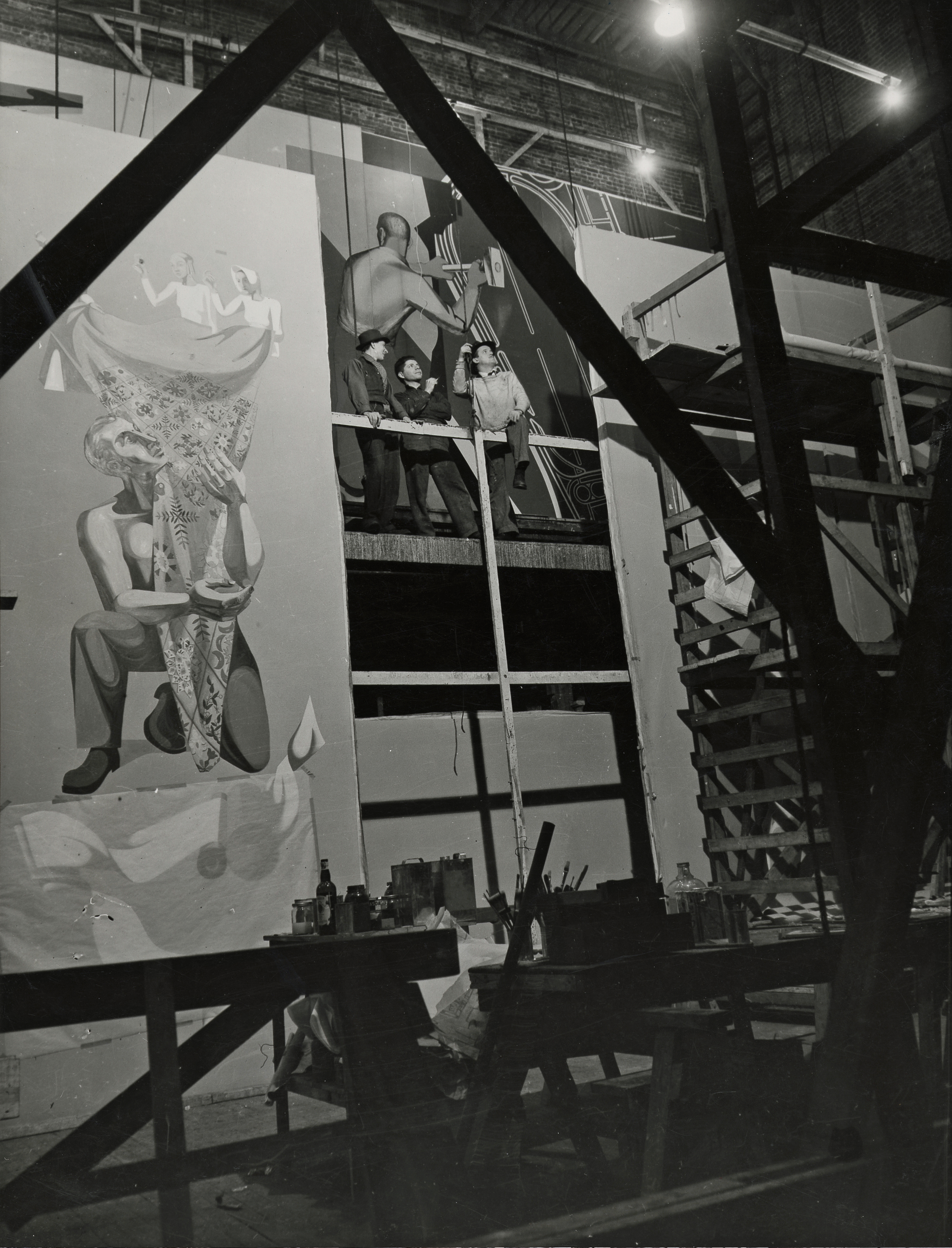
Anton Refregier (1905–1979)

- Leonard Bahr (d. 1990), painter, muralist, illustrator
- Grace Clements (d. 1969), muralist, mosaicist, art critic
- Perle Fine (d. 1988), painter
- Jared French (d. 1988), painter
- Forrest Hibbits (d. 1996), watercolorist, illustrator
- Winnifred Hudson (d. 1996), abstract painter
- Lois Mailou Jones (d. 1998), painter
- Martin W. Kellogg (d. 1989), portrait painter
- Doris Lee (d. 1983), painter
- Joseph Meert (d. 1989), painter, muralist, printmaker
- Paul Meltsner (d. 1966), painter
- Barnett Newman (d. 1970), painter
- Sanford Plummer (d. 1974), watercolorist
- James Amos Porter (d. 1970), painter, art historian
- Anton Refregier (d. 1979), Russian-born painter
- Kurt Roesch (d. 1984), painter
- Ray Strong (d. 2006), painter
- Sabina Teichman (d. 1983), painter

=== 1906 ===
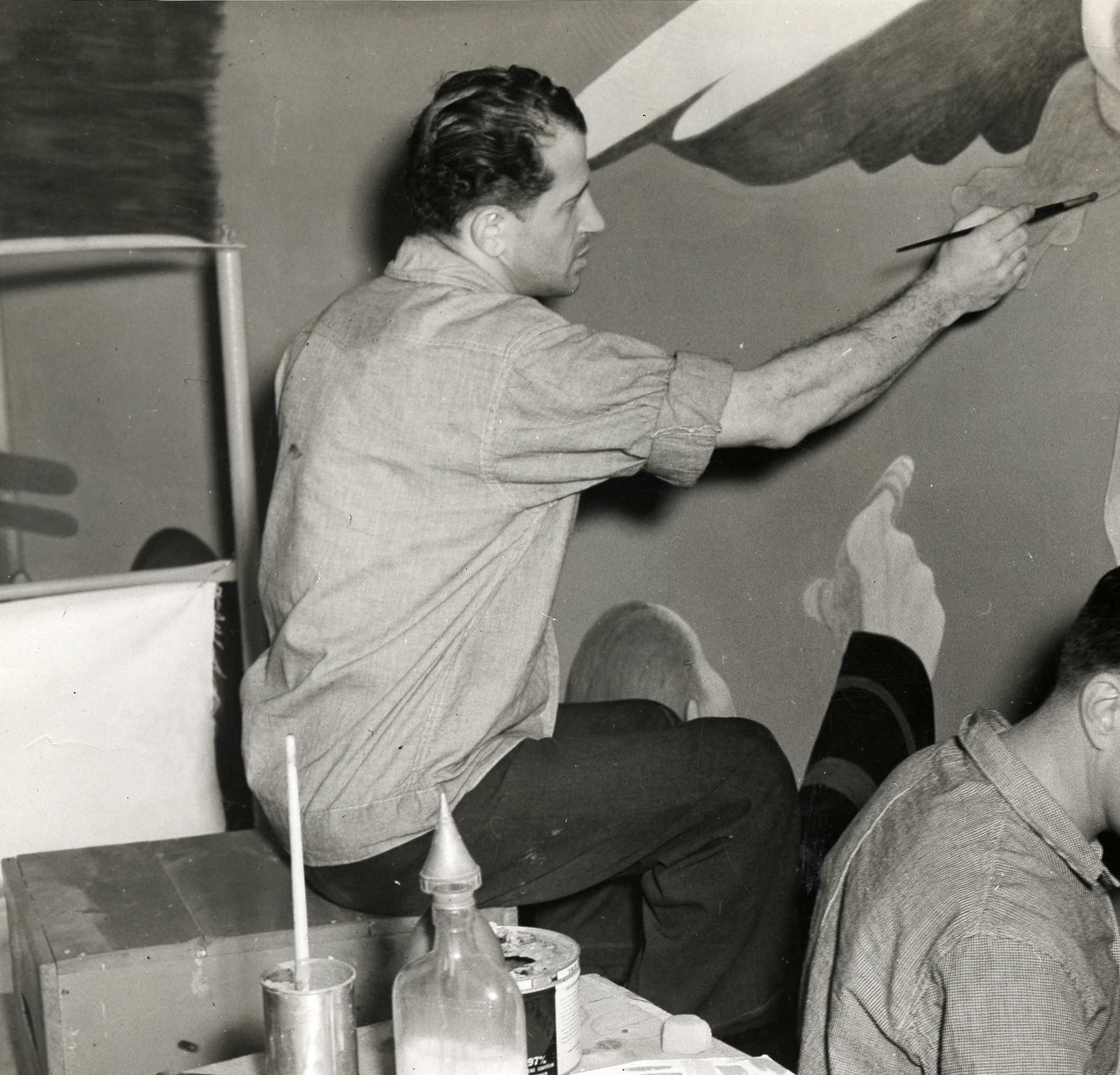
James Brooks (1906–1992)

- Harry Anderson (d. 1996), painter, illustrator
- Peter Blume (d. 1992), painter
- James Brooks (d. 1992), painter, muralist
- Ralston Crawford (d. 1978), painter, lithographer, photographer
- Burgoyne Diller (d. 1965), painter
- Herbert Ferber (d. 1991), sculptor
- Crockett Johnson (d. 1975), cartoonist, illustrator, mathematical painter
- Philip Johnson (d. 2005), architect, art collector
- Henry E McDaniel (d. 2008), painter
- Anna Louisa Miller (d. 1997), painter
- Dorothy Morang (d. 1994), painter, pastelist
- Ludwig Sander (d. 1975), painter
- David Smith (d. 1965), sculptor
- Leon Polk Smith (d. 1996), painter

=== 1907 ===
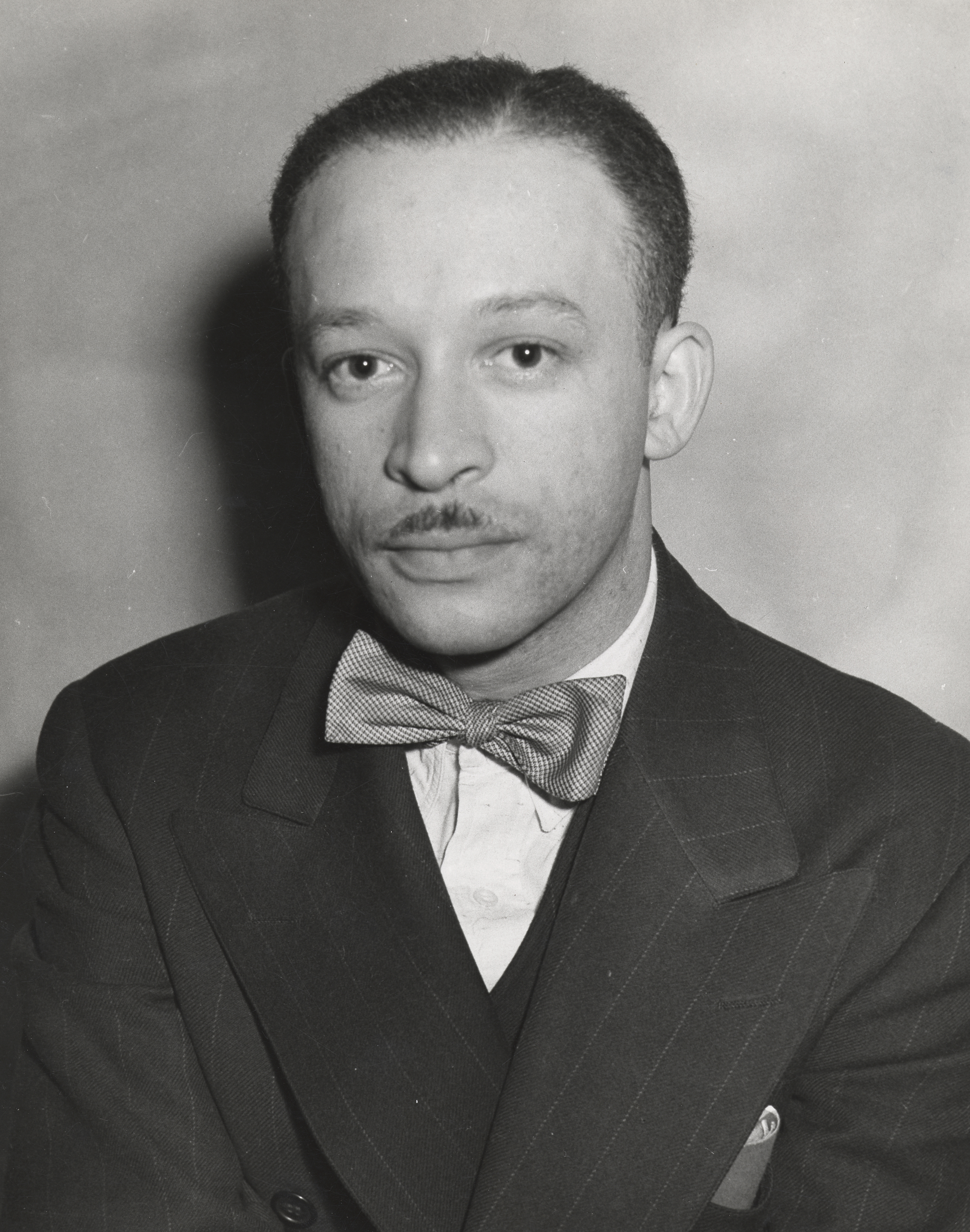
Charles Alston (1907–1977)

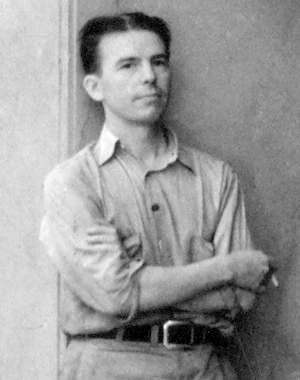
Thomas C. Lea III (1907–2001)

- Acee Blue Eagle (d. 1959), painter, muralist
- Charles Alston (d. 1977), painter
- Ilya Bolotowsky (d. 1981), painter, printmaker
- Marie Z. Chino (d. 1982), potter, ceramist
- Constance Edith Fowler (d. 1996), painter, printmaker
- Jon Gnagy (d. 1981), painter, illustrator, television art instructor
- Jacob Kainen (d. 2001), painter
- Albert Kotin (d. 1980), painter
- Thomas C. Lea III (d. 2001), muralist, illustrator, painter
- Michael Loew (d. 1985), painter
- Harry Mintz (d. 2002), painter
- Walter Tandy Murch (d. 1967), painter
- Fairfield Porter (d. 1975), painter
- Gregorio Prestopino (d. 1984), painter
- George Rickey (d. 2002), sculptor
- Theodore Roszak (d. 1981), sculptor, painter
- Millard Sheets (d. 1989), painter
- Bernard Joseph Steffen (d. 1980), painter, printmaker
- Henriette Wyeth (d. 1997), painter

=== 1908 ===
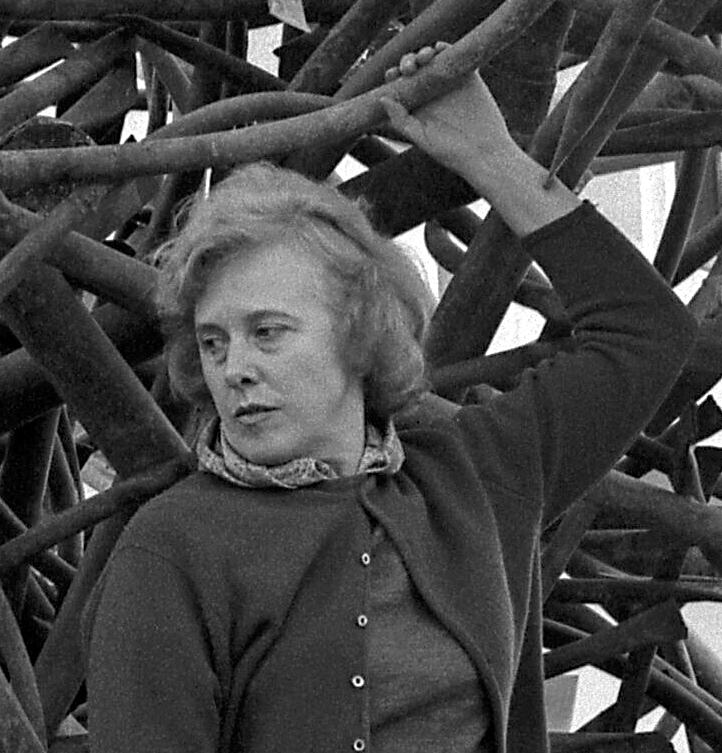
Claire Falkenstein (1908–1997)

- Claire Falkenstein (d. 1997), sculptor
- Sybil Gibson (d. 1995), painter
- Herblock (d. 2001), political cartoonist
- Lee Krasner (d. 1984), painter
- Helen Lundeberg (d. 1999), painter
- Nicholas Marsicano (d. 1991), painter
- George McNeil (d. 1995), painter
- Roger Tory Peterson (d. 1996), graphic artist, illustrator, naturalist
- Wilber Moore Stilwell (d. 1974), depression era artist
- Minor White (d. 1976), photographer

=== 1909 ===
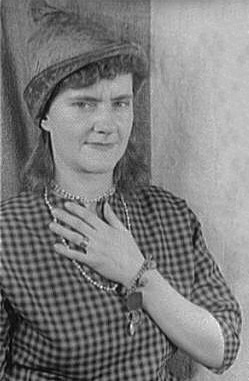
Gertrude Abercrombie (1909–1977)

11

- Gertrude Abercrombie (d. 1977), surrealist painter
- Jean Cory Beall, (d. 1978), painter, public artist
- Al Capp (d. 1979), cartoonist
- Ettore "Ted" DeGrazia (d. 1982), Impressionist painter, sculptor, lithographer
- Enrico Donati (d. 2008), painter
- Cornelia MacIntyre Foley (d. 2010), painter
- Charles Gordon (d. 1978), watercolorist
- Dorothy Stratton King (d. 2007), painter, printmaker
- Jacob Lipkin (d. 1996), sculptor
- Norman Lewis (d. 1979), painter
- Alex Raymond (d. 1956), cartoonist
- Herman Rose (d. 2007), painter
- Manfred Schwartz (d. 1970), painter
- Fay Morgan Taylor (d. 1990), modernist artist

== Born 1910–1919 ==
=== 1910 ===
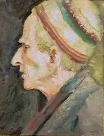
Fuller Potter (1910–1990)

- Leonard Bocour (d. 1993), paint-maker, painter, art collector
- Paul Feeley (d. 1966), painter
- James FitzGerald (d. 1973), sculptor, painter
- Morris Graves (d. 2001), painter, printmaker
- Hiroshi Honda (d. 1970), painter
- Franz Kline (d. 1962), painter
- Fuller Potter (d. 1990), painter
- Mitchell Siporin (d. 1976), painter
- Hedda Sterne (d. 2011), Romanian-born painter
- Dorothea Tanning (d. 2012), surrealist painter, sculptor, printmaker

=== 1911 ===
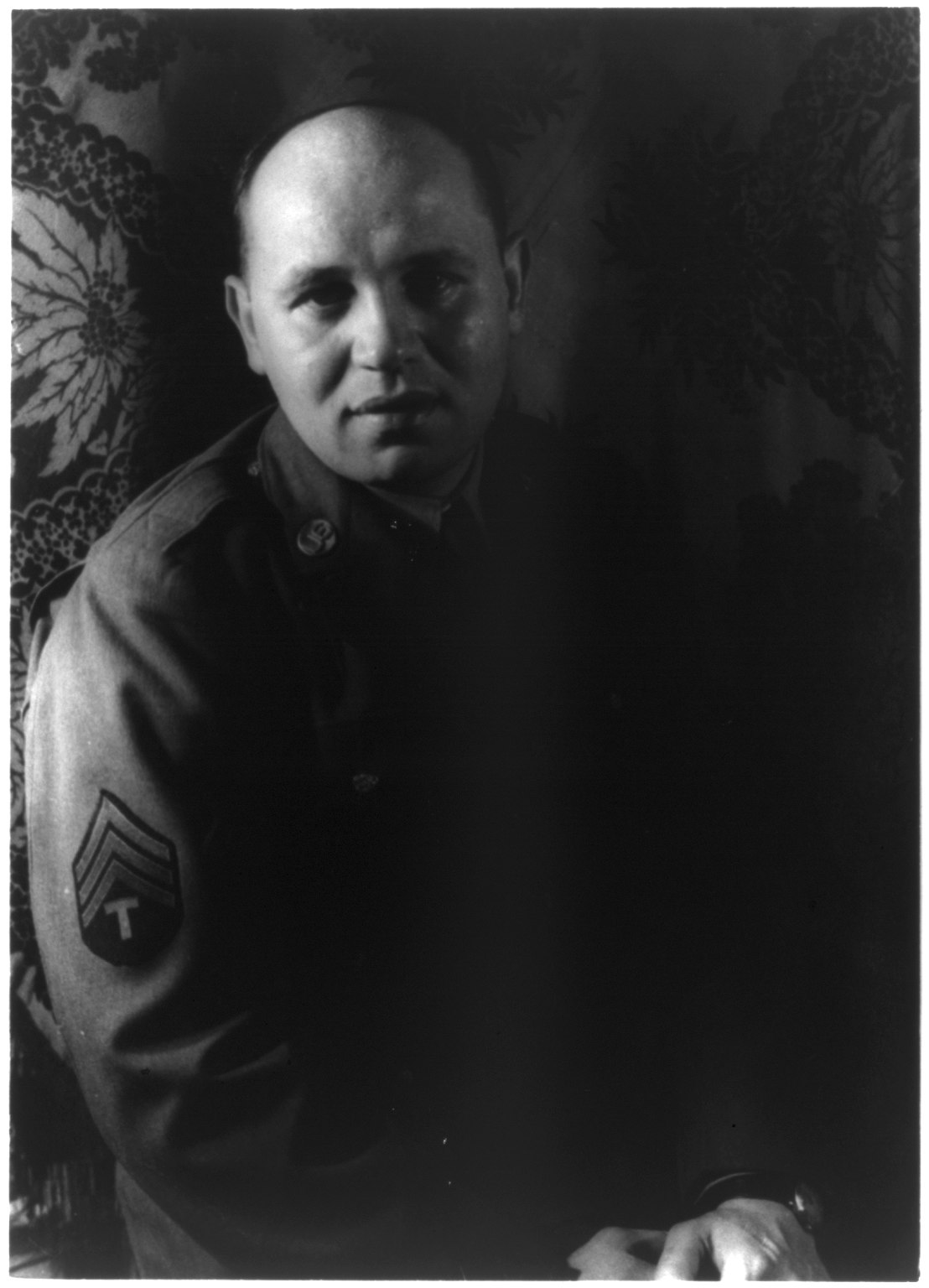
Romare Bearden (1911–1988)

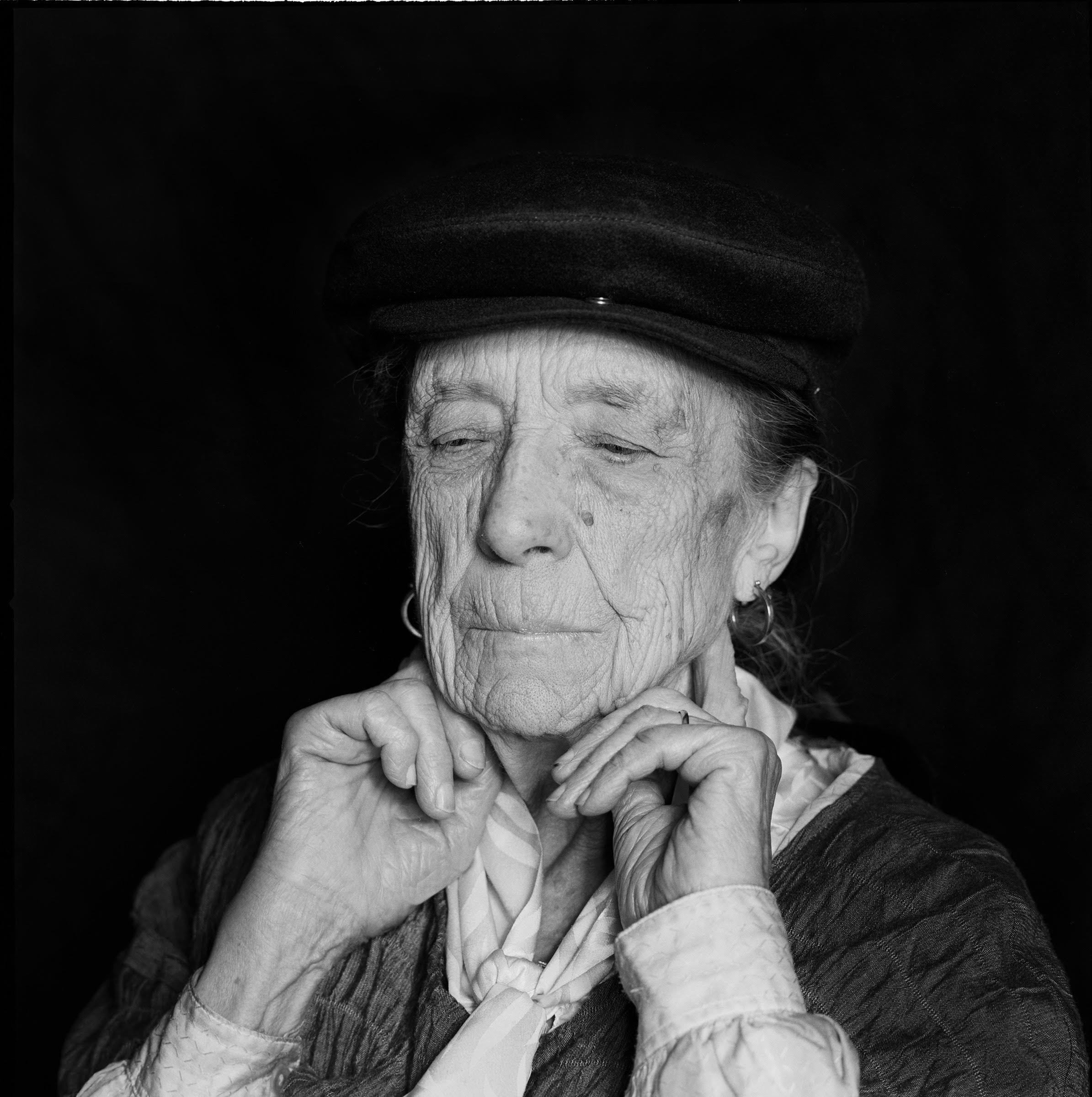
Louise Bourgeois (1911–2010)

- Arnold Arbeit (d. 1974), architect, sculptor, painter
- Will Barnet (d. 2012), painter, printmaker
- Romare Bearden (d. 1988), painter, printmaker
- Louise Bourgeois (d. 2010), French-born sculptor, printmaker
- Eleanor Layfield Davis (d. 1985), painter, sculptor
- John McCrady (d. 1968), painter
- Carl Morris (d. 1993), painter, muralist
- Hilda Grossman Morris (d. 1991), sculptor
- David Park (d. 1960), painter
- Kara Shepherd (d. 1984), surrealist painter
- Kurt Sluizer (d. 1988), painter

=== 1912 ===
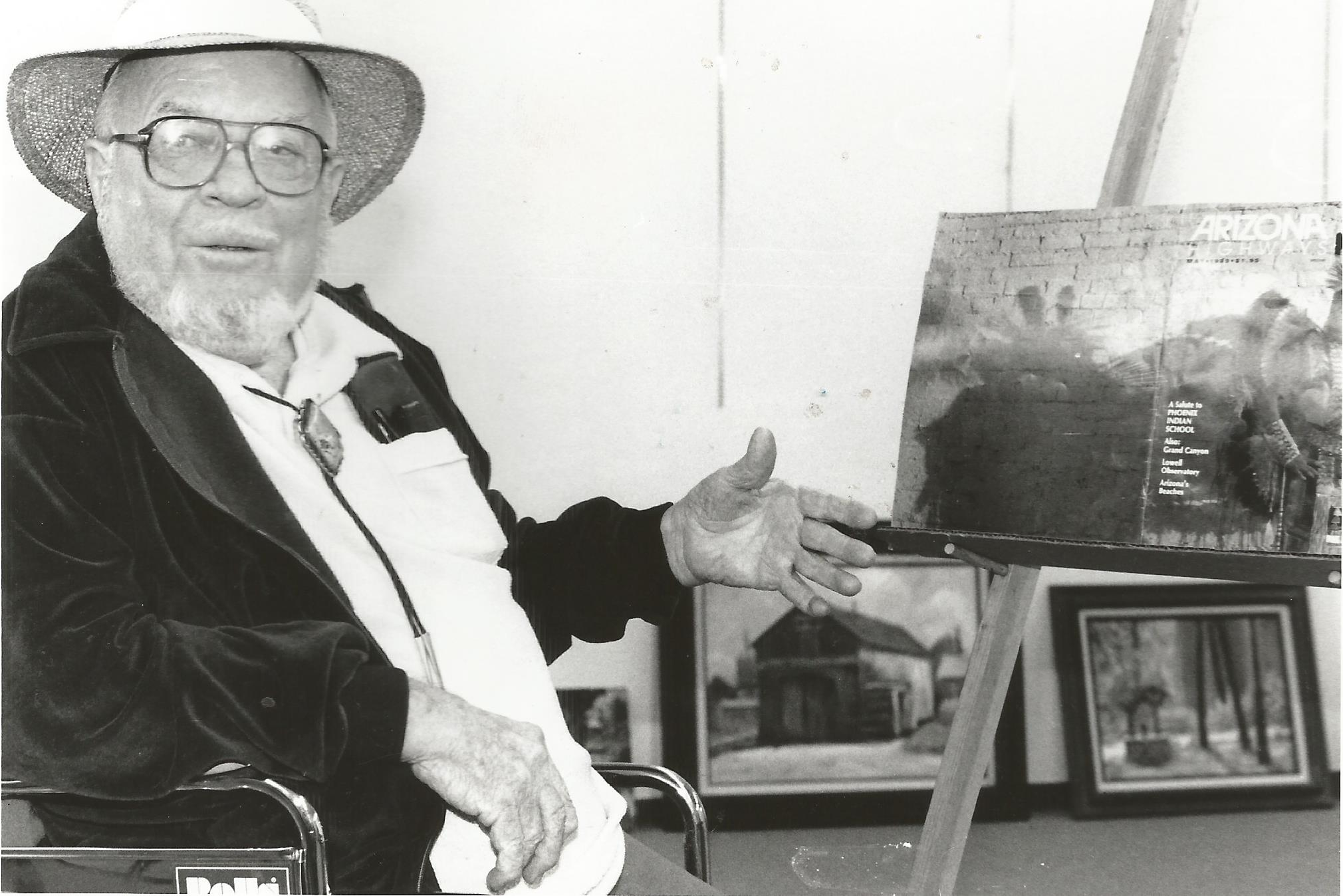
Carl Thorp (1912–1989)

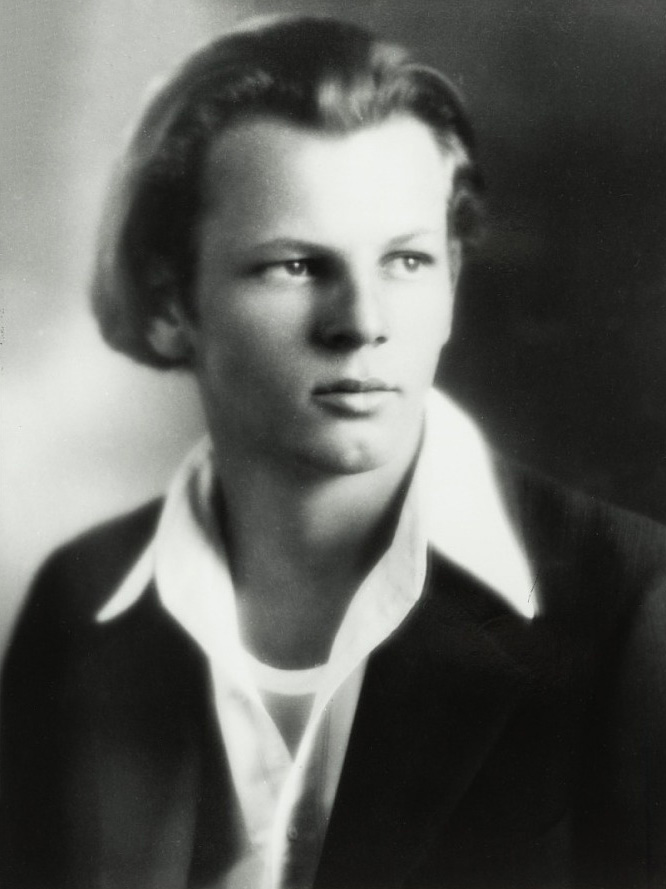
Jackson Pollock (1912–1956)

- Charles Addams (d. 1988), cartoonist
- William Baziotes (d. 1963), painter
- William Congdon (d. 1998), painter
- William Franklin Draper (d. 2003), painter
- Fay Kleinman (d. 2012), painter
- Ida Kohlmeyer (d. 1997), painter, sculptor
- Alexander Liberman (d. 1999), painter, sculptor
- Morris Louis (d. 1962), painter
- Agnes Martin (d. 2004), painter
- Philip Pavia (d. 2005), sculptor
- Jackson Pollock (d. 1956), painter
- Raymond Francis Robbins (d. 1980), intricate realist paintings
- Charlotte Rothstein Ross (d. 1991), lithograph artist
- Walter Sanford (d. 1987), artist
- Tony Smith (d. 1980), sculptor
- George Sugarman (d. 1999), sculptor
- Carl Thorp (d. 1989), impressionist California landscapes

=== 1913 ===
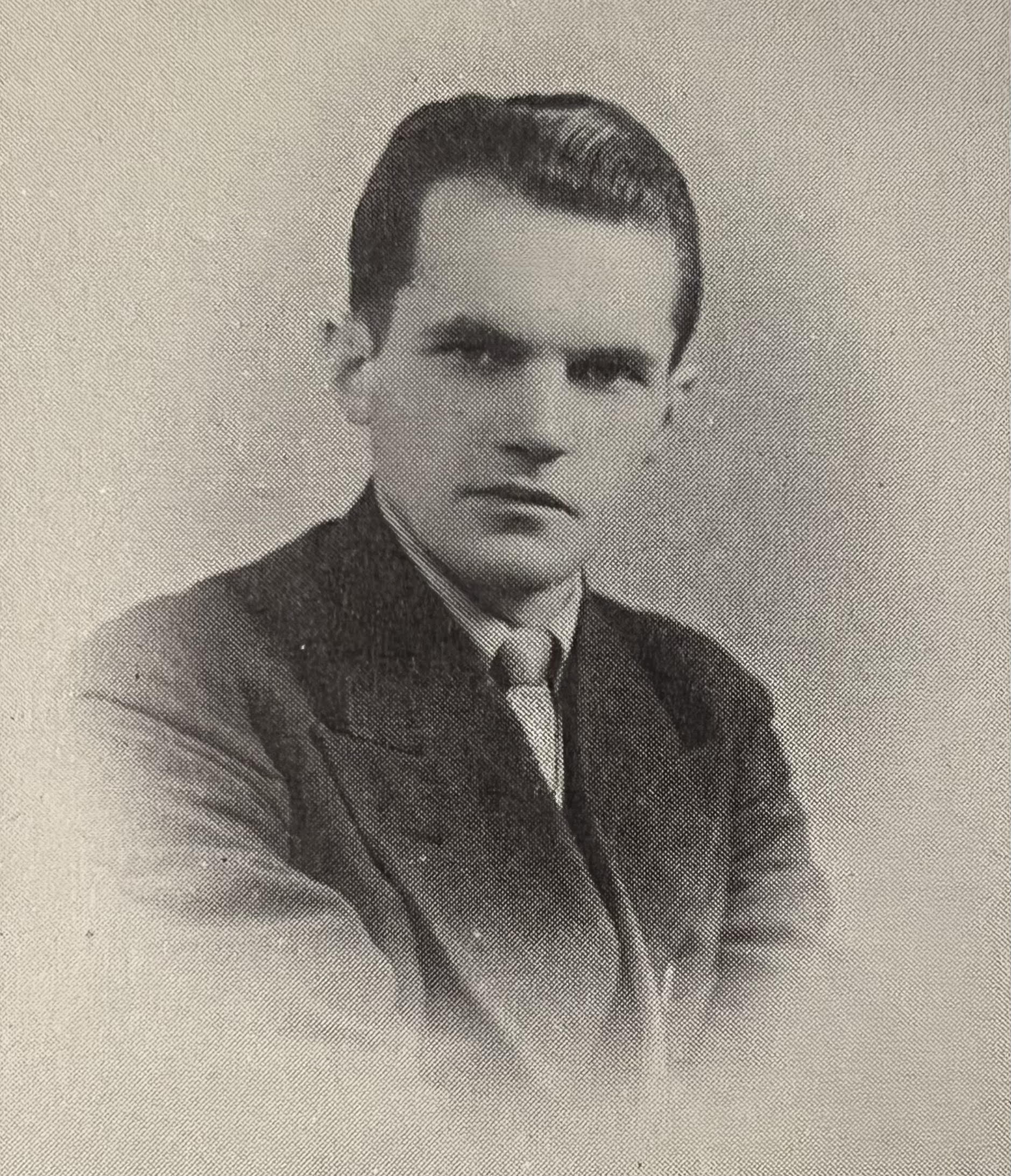
Mario Dal Fabbro (1913–1990)

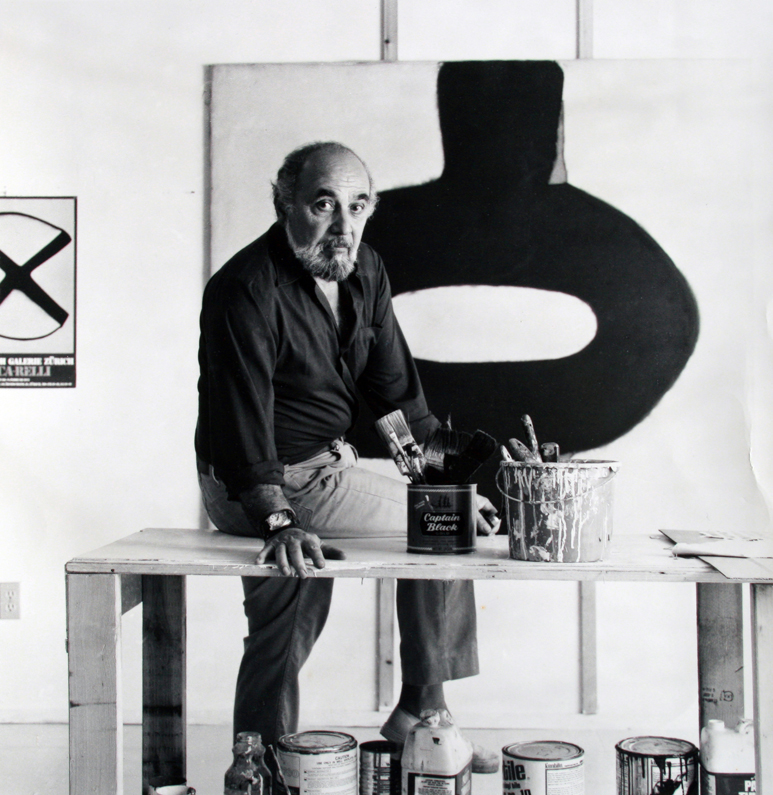
Conrad Marca-Relli (1913–2000)

- Peter Agostini (d. 1993)
- Ralph Leon Bagley (d. 2008), artist, art instructor
- Harold Black (d. 1993), painter, muralist
- Hyman Bloom (d. 2009), painter
- Lawrence Calcagno (d. 1993), painter
- Robert Capa (d. 1954), photographer
- Mario Dal Fabbro (d. 1990), Italian-born sculptor, furniture designer
- Mary Gehr (d. 1997), painter, printmaker
- Philip Guston (d. 1980), painter, printmaker
- Reuben Kadish (d. 1992), sculptor
- James Kelly (d. 2003), painter
- Ibram Lassaw (d. 2003), Egyptian-born sculptor
- Conrad Marca-Relli (d. 2000), collage artist, painter
- Mercedes Matter (d. 2001), painter
- Ruthe Katherine Pearlman (d. 2007), painter, art educator
- Ad Reinhardt (d. 1967), painter, printmaker
- Bettina Steinke (d. 1999), painter, muralist

=== 1914 ===
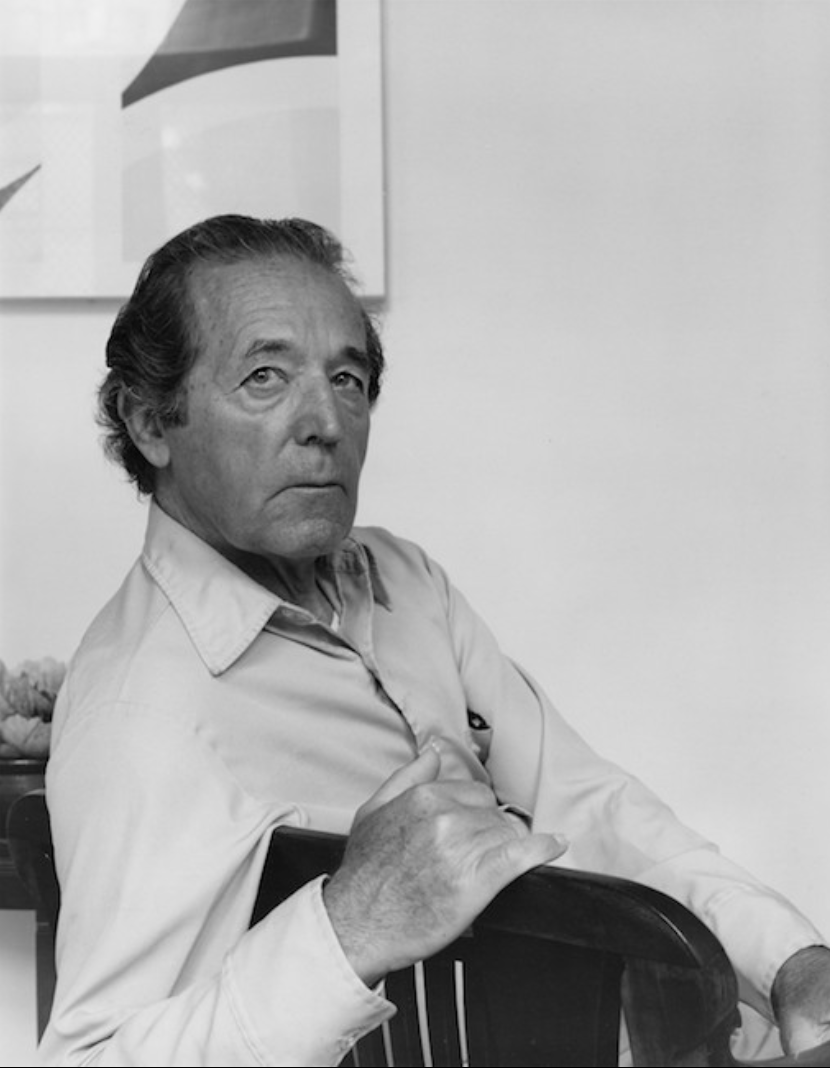
Nassos Daphnis (1914–2010)

- Glen Alps (d. 1996), printmaker, sculptor
- Ward Brackett (d. 2006), illustrator
- Nassos Daphnis (d. 2010), painter
- Allan Houser (d. 1994), painter, sculptor
- Gwendolyn Knight (d. 2005), painter
- Tony Rosenthal (d. 2009), sculptor
- Charles Shannon (d. 1996), painter
- Alton Tobey (d. 2005), painter, muralist, illustrator
- Emerson Woelffer (d. 2003), painter

=== 1915 ===
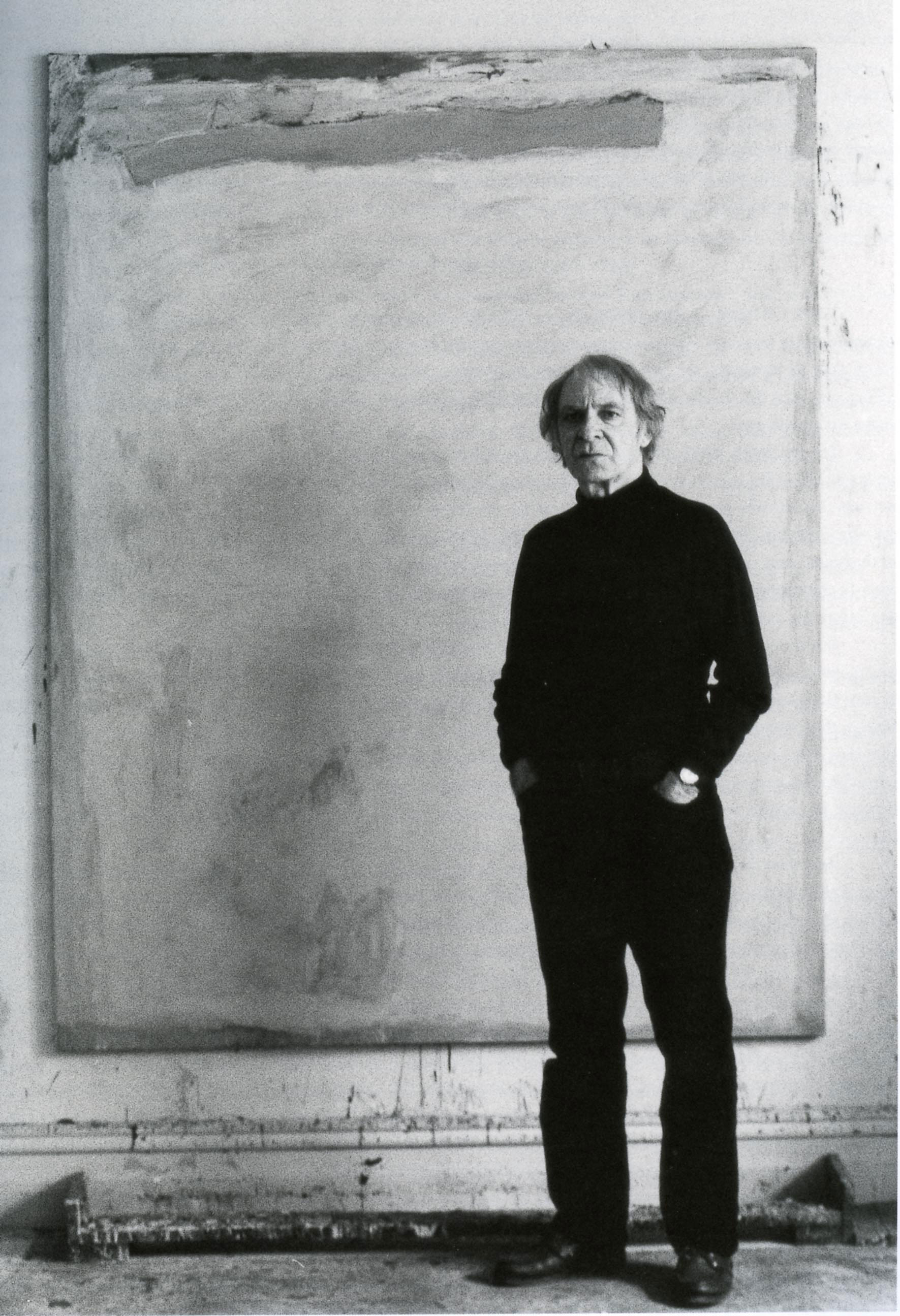
Edward Dugmore (1915–1996)

- Elizabeth Catlett (d. 2012), sculptor, printmaker
- Claude Clark (d. 2001), painter
- John Rogers Cox (d. 1990), painter
- Edward Dugmore (d. 1996), painter
- Friedel Dzubas (d. 1994), painter
- Ruth Gikow (d. 1982), muralist
- Sam Golden (d. 1997), paint-maker, painter
- Bob Kane (d. 1998), cartoonist
- Jack Levine (d. 2010), painter
- Clayton Lewis (d. 1995), painter, sculptor
- Richard Lippold (d. 2002), sculptor
- Nellie Meadows (d. 2006), artist
- Robert Motherwell (d. 1991), painter, printmaker
- Hans Namuth (d. 1990), photographer

=== 1916 ===
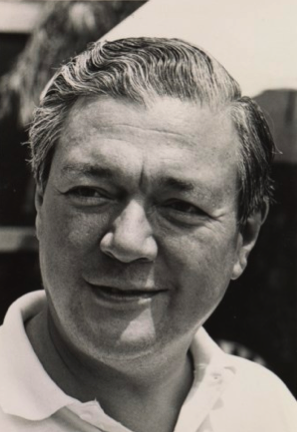
Alfonso Ossorio (1916–1990)

- Adolf Aldrich (d. 2010), printmaker
- Elmer Bischoff (d. 1991), painter
- Warren Eugene Brandon (d. 1977), painter
- Eyvind Earle (d. 2000), painter
- Leonard Edmondson (d. 2002), painter, printmaker
- Joseph Goto (d. 1994), sculptor
- Karl Kasten (d. 2010), painter, printmaker, educator
- Ethel Magafan (d. 1993), painter
- Montyne (d. 1989), painter
- Alfonso Ossorio (d. 1990), painter, collagist
- Eunice Parsons (d. 2024), modernist collagist
- Paul Penczner (d. 2010), painter
- Richard Pousette-Dart (d. 1992), painter
- Jon Schueler (d. 1992), painter
- Sylvia Sleigh (d. 2010), painter
- Reuben Tam (d. 1991), painter

=== 1917 ===
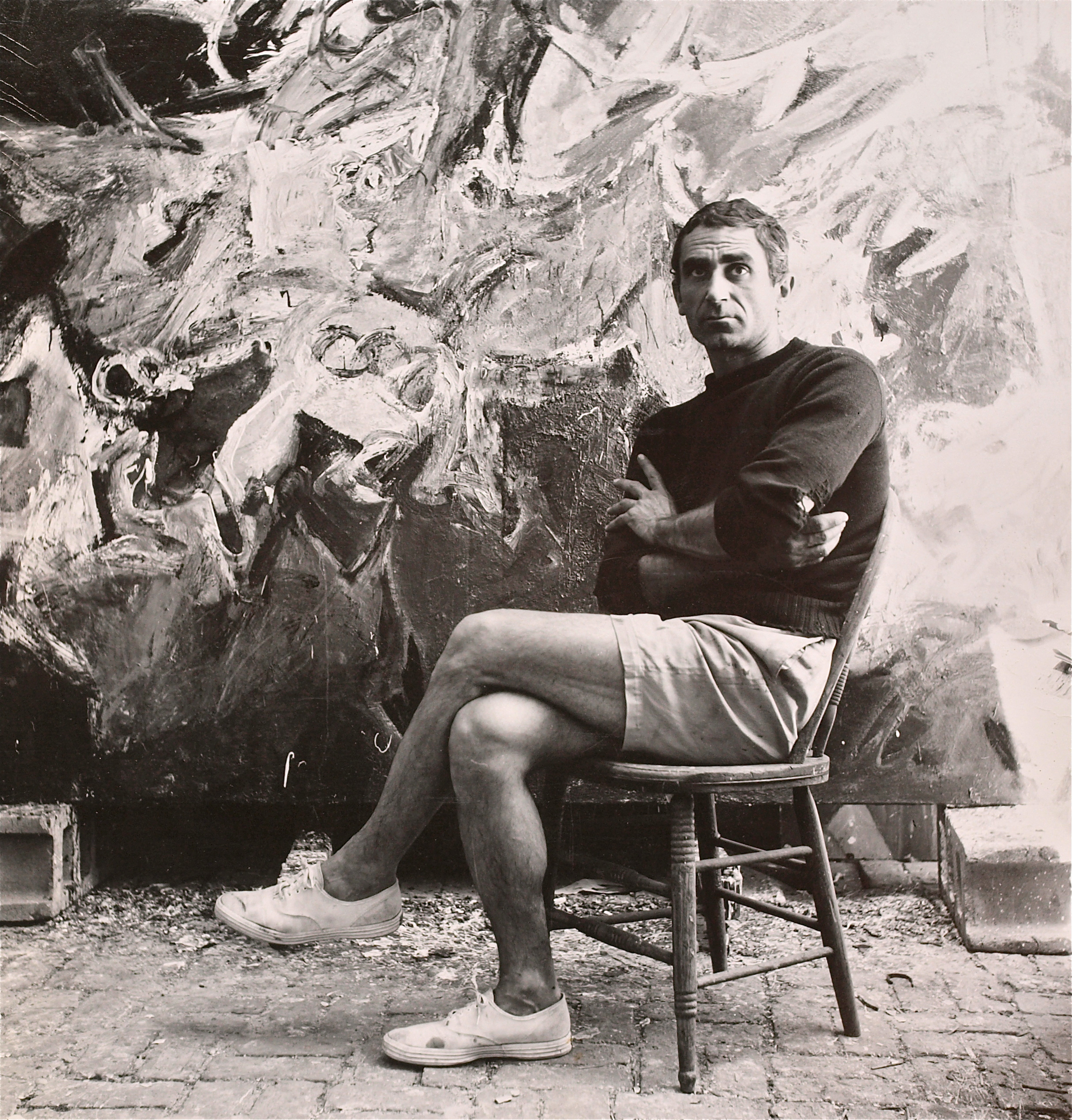
Nicolas Carone (1917–2010)

- Kathleen Gemberling Adkison (d. 2010), abstract expressionist painter
- Albert Alcalay (d. 2008), painter
- Nicolas Carone (d. 2010), painter
- Maya Deren (d. 1961), avant-garde filmmaker, theorist, photographer
- Manny Farber (d. 2008), painter, film critic
- Edith Frohock (d. 1997), painter, printmaker
- Robert Goodnough (d. 2010), painter
- Stephen Greene (d. 1999), painter
- David Hare (d. 1992), sculptor, photographer
- Jacob Lawrence (d. 2000), painter, printmaker
- Louisa Matthíasdóttir (d. 2000), Icelandic-born painter
- Malcolm H. Myers (d. 2002), painter, printmaker
- Milton Resnick (d. 2004), painter
- Robert Richenburg (d. 2006), painter
- Syd Solomon (d. 2004), painter
- Andrew Wyeth (d. 2009), painter

=== 1918 ===
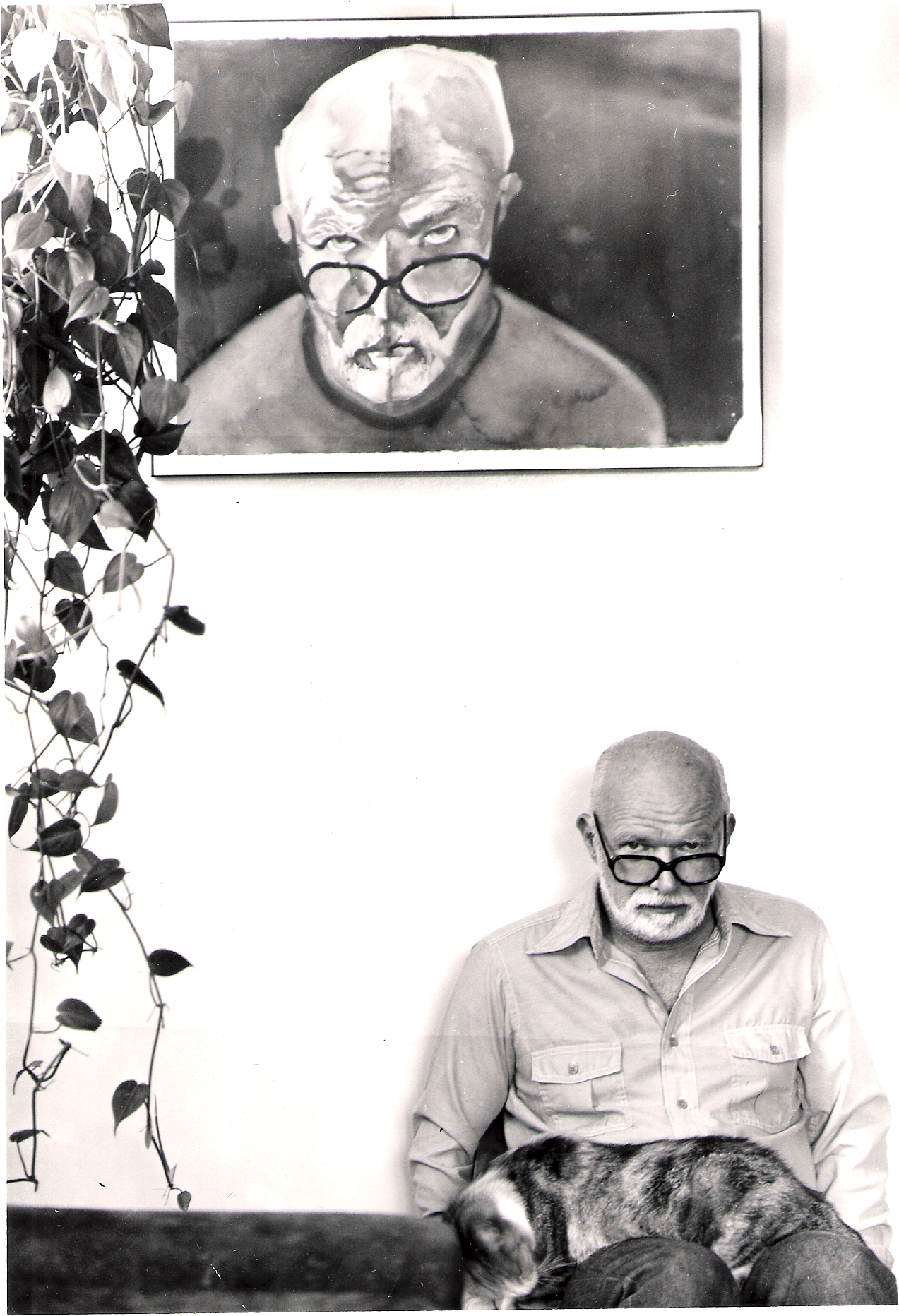
Keith Crown (1918–2010)

- Ronald Bladen (d. 1988), sculptor
- Cornell Capa (d. 2008), photographer
- Gladys Clark (d. 2011), spinner and weaver
- Keith Crown (d. 2010), abstract painter
- Elaine de Kooning (d. 1989), painter
- Jane Frank (d. 1986), painter
- Cleve Gray (d. 2004), painter
- Stephen Pace (d. 2010), painter
- David Foster Pratt (d. 2010), painter
- Joseph Rajer (d. 1976), printmaker
- Gerard Francis Tempest (d. 2009), painter, sculptor
- Alberto Valdés (d. 1998), painter
- Charles Banks Wilson (d. 2013), painter

=== 1919 ===
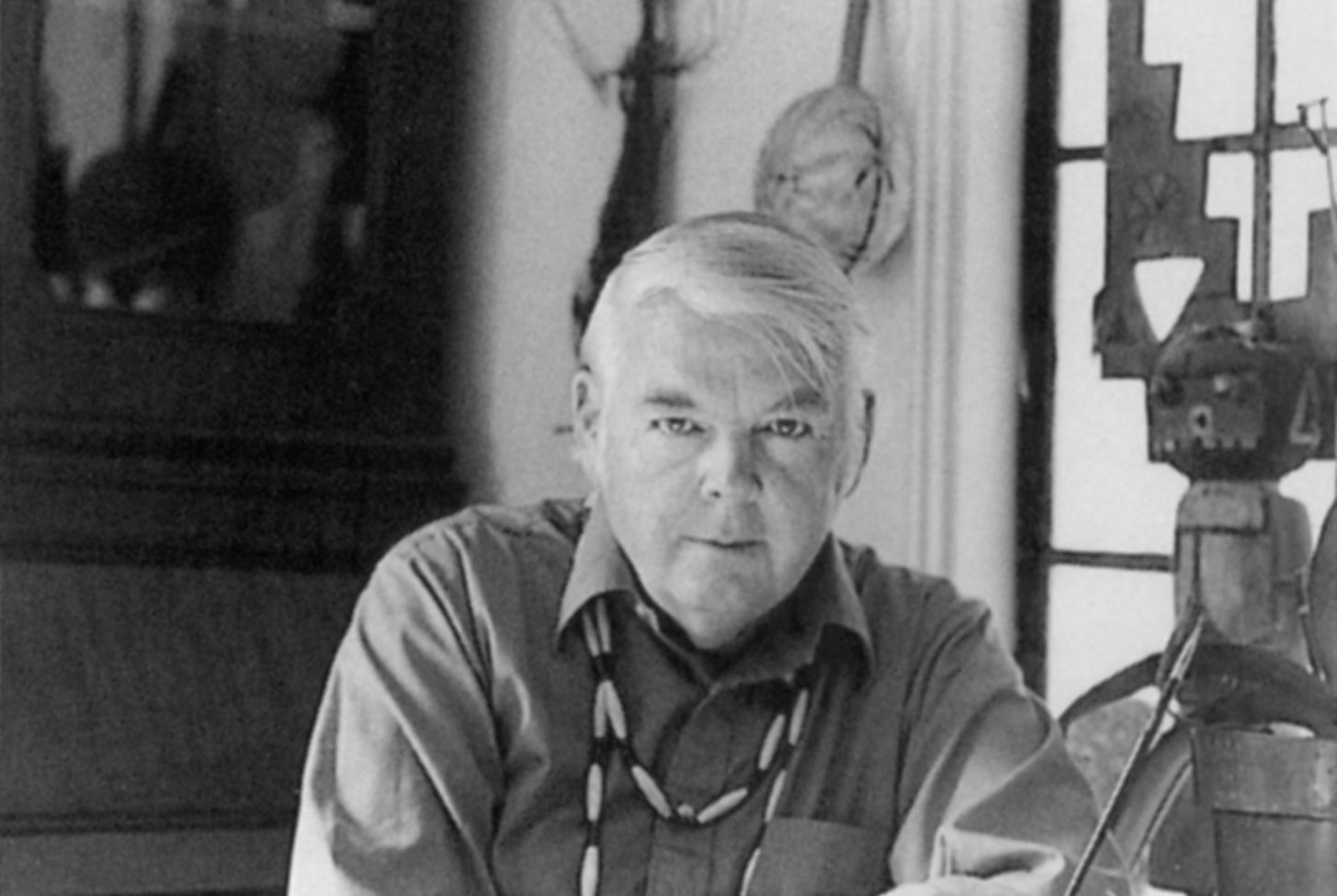
Lee Mullican (1919–1998)

- Theophilus Brown (d. 2012), painter
- Fritz Bultman (d. 1985), painter, sculptor
- Edward Corbett (d. 1971), painter
- Frederick Hammersley (d. 2009), painter
- Lester Johnson (d. 2010), painter
- Irving Kriesberg (d. 2009), painter
- Alden Mason (d. 2013), painter
- Lee Mullican (d. 1998), painter
- John Wilde (d. 2006), painter, draughtsman, printmaker

== Born 1920–1929 ==
=== 1920 ===
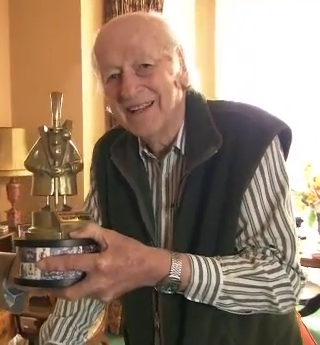
Ray Harryhausen (1920–2013)

- Charlot Byj (d. 1983), greeting card, advertising artist
- John Coplans (d. 2003), British-born painter, photographer
- Gene Davis (d. 1985), painter, printmaker
- Jimmy Ernst (d. 1984), painter
- Elaine Hamilton (d. 2010), painter
- Ray Harryhausen (d. 2013), stop-motion animator, sculptor
- Luchita Hurtado (d. 2020), painter
- Herbert Katzman (d. 2004), painter
- Eugene Mackaben (d. 1984), painter
- Roger Medearis (d. 2001), painter
- Albert Nemethy (d. 1998), painter
- Honoré Desmond Sharrer (d. 2009), painter
- Wayne Thiebaud (d. 2021), painter, printmaker
- George Tooker (d. 2011), painter
- Hannah Tompkins (d. 1995), painter, printmaker
- Paul Wonner (d. 2008), painter
- Jean Zaleski (d. 2010), painter

=== 1921 ===
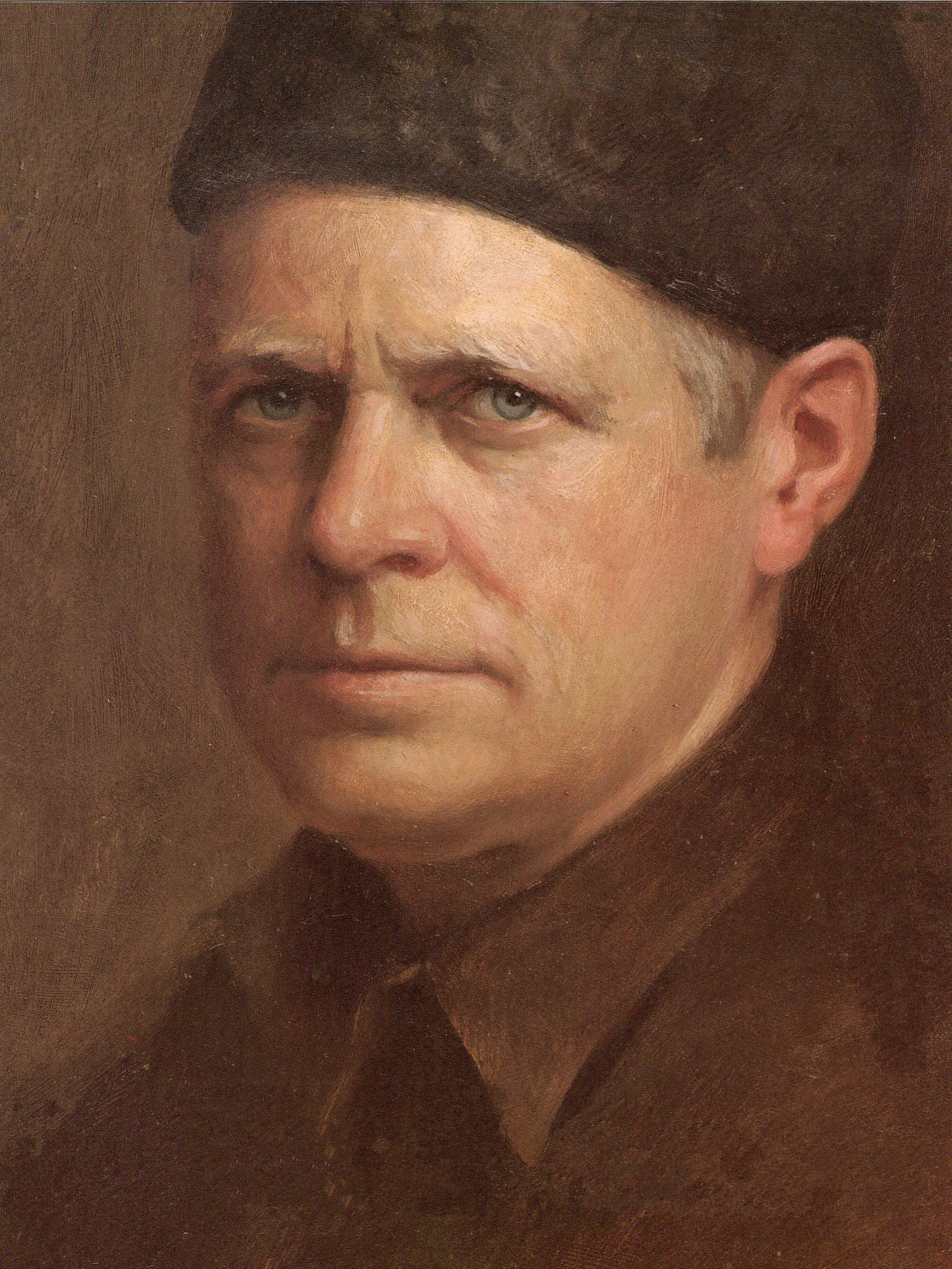
Herbert Abrams (1921–2003)

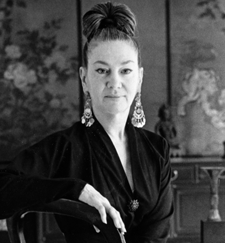
Leona Wood (1921–2008)

- Herbert Abrams (d. 2003), painter
- Gertrude Bleiberg (d. 2001), painter
- Norman Bluhm (d. 1999), painter
- Edward Boccia (d. 2012), painter
- William Brice (d. 2008), painter
- Thomas Chimes (d. 2009), painter
- Lillian Desow-Fishbein (d. 2004), painter
- Norris Embry (d. 1981), painter
- Salvatore Grippi (d. 2017), painter, printmaker
- Charles Li Hidley (d. 2003), abstract expressionist
- Al Jaffee (d. 2023), cartoonist
- Frank Lobdell (d. 2013), painter
- Joe Stefanelli (d. 2017), painter
- Anne Truitt (d. 2004), sculptor
- Ralph Burke Tyree (d. 1979), painter
- Leona Wood (d. 2008), painter

=== 1922 ===
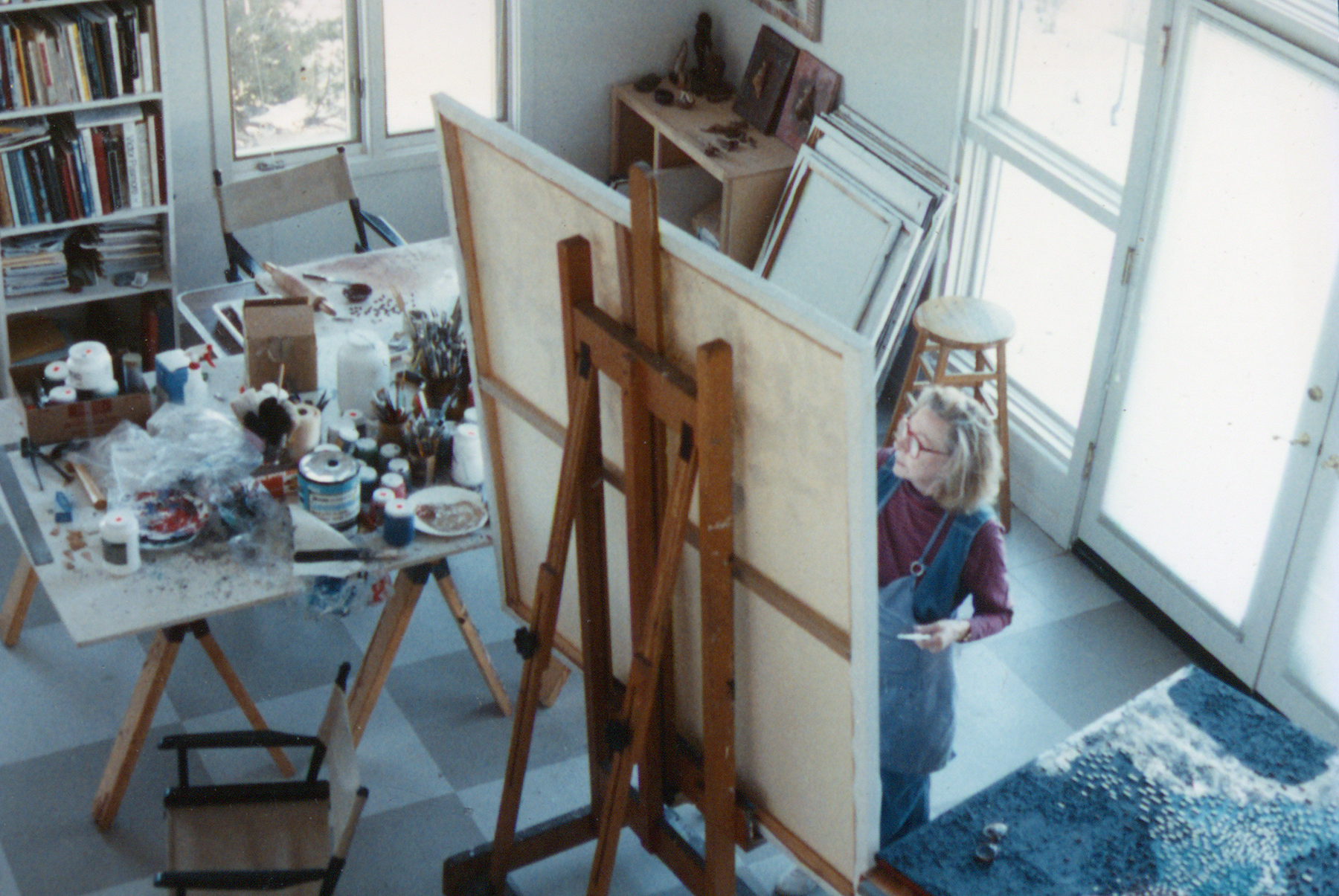
Virginia Dehn (1922–2005)

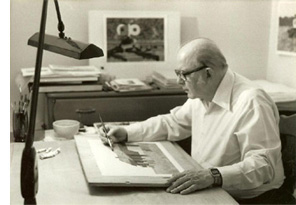
Stan Masters (1922–2005)

- Leonard Baskin (d. 2000), sculptor, printmaker
- Leland Bell (d. 1991), painter
- Nell Blaine (d. 1996), painter
- Robert De Niro, Sr. (d. 1993), painter
- Virginia Dehn (d. 2005), painter, printmaker
- Richard Diebenkorn (d. 1993), painter, printmaker
- Kahlil Gibran (d. 2008), sculptor, inventor, painter
- Helen Gilbert (d. 2002), painter, kinetic sculptor
- Charlotte Gilbertson (d. 2014), painter, printmaker
- Leon Golub (d. 2004), painter
- Grace Hartigan (d. 2008), painter
- Julius Hatofsky (d. 2006), painter
- John Hultberg (d. 2005), painter
- Matsumi Kanemitsu (d. 1992), painter, lithographer
- Albert Kresch (d. 2022), painter
- Harvey Littleton (d. 2013), glass artist
- Stan Masters (d. 2005), painter
- Jules Olitski (d. 2007), painter
- Ray Parker (d. 1990), painter
- Charles Cropper Parks (d. 2012), sculptor
- Haywood Rivers (d. 2001), painter
- Theodoros Stamos (d. 1997), painter
- Richard Stankiewicz (d. 1983)
- Jim Steg (d. 2001), printmaker, collage artist
- H. C. Westermann (d. 1981), sculptor

=== 1923 ===
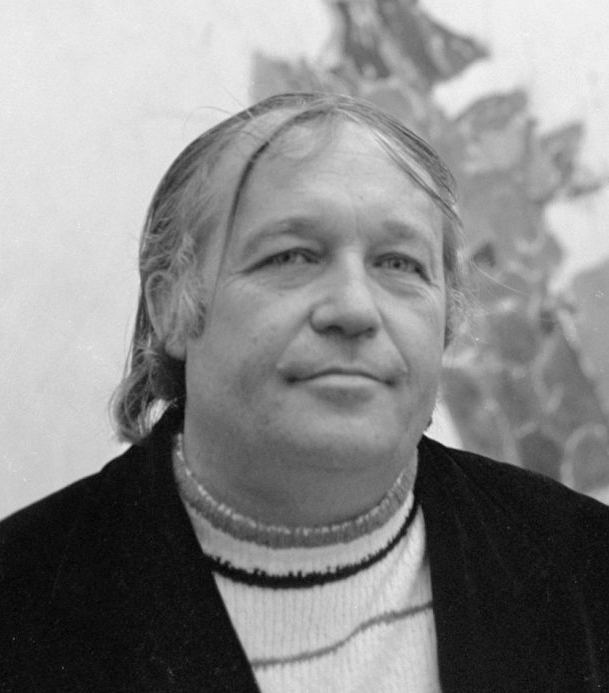
Sam Francis (1923–1994)

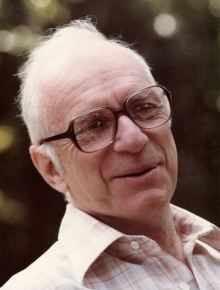
Stanley Hess (1923–2019)

- Diane Arbus (d. 1971), photographer
- David Aronson (d. 2015), painter
- Richard Artschwager (d. 2013), painter, sculptor
- Robert Beauchamp (d. 1995), painter
- Erlena Chisolm Bland (d. 2009), painter
- John Boatright (d. 2006), painter
- Ernest Briggs (d. 1984), painter
- John Ery Coleman (d. 1993), painter
- Jess Collins (d. 2004), painter, collage artist
- Sam Francis (d. 1994), painter, printmaker
- Charles Garabedian (d. 2016), painter
- Paul Georges (d. 2002), painter
- Stanley Hess (d. 2019), muralist, painter
- Shirley Jaffe (d. 2016), painter
- Paul Jenkins (d. 2012), painter
- Ellsworth Kelly (d. 2015), painter, printmaker
- Jonah Kinigstein (d. 2025), painter
- Roy Lichtenstein (d. 1997), painter, sculptor, printmaker
- Knox Martin (d. 2022), painter, sculptor, muralist
- Fred Mitchell (d. 2013), painter
- Ruth Mountaingrove (d. 2016), feminist photographer, poet
- Larry Rivers (d. 2002), painter

=== 1924 ===
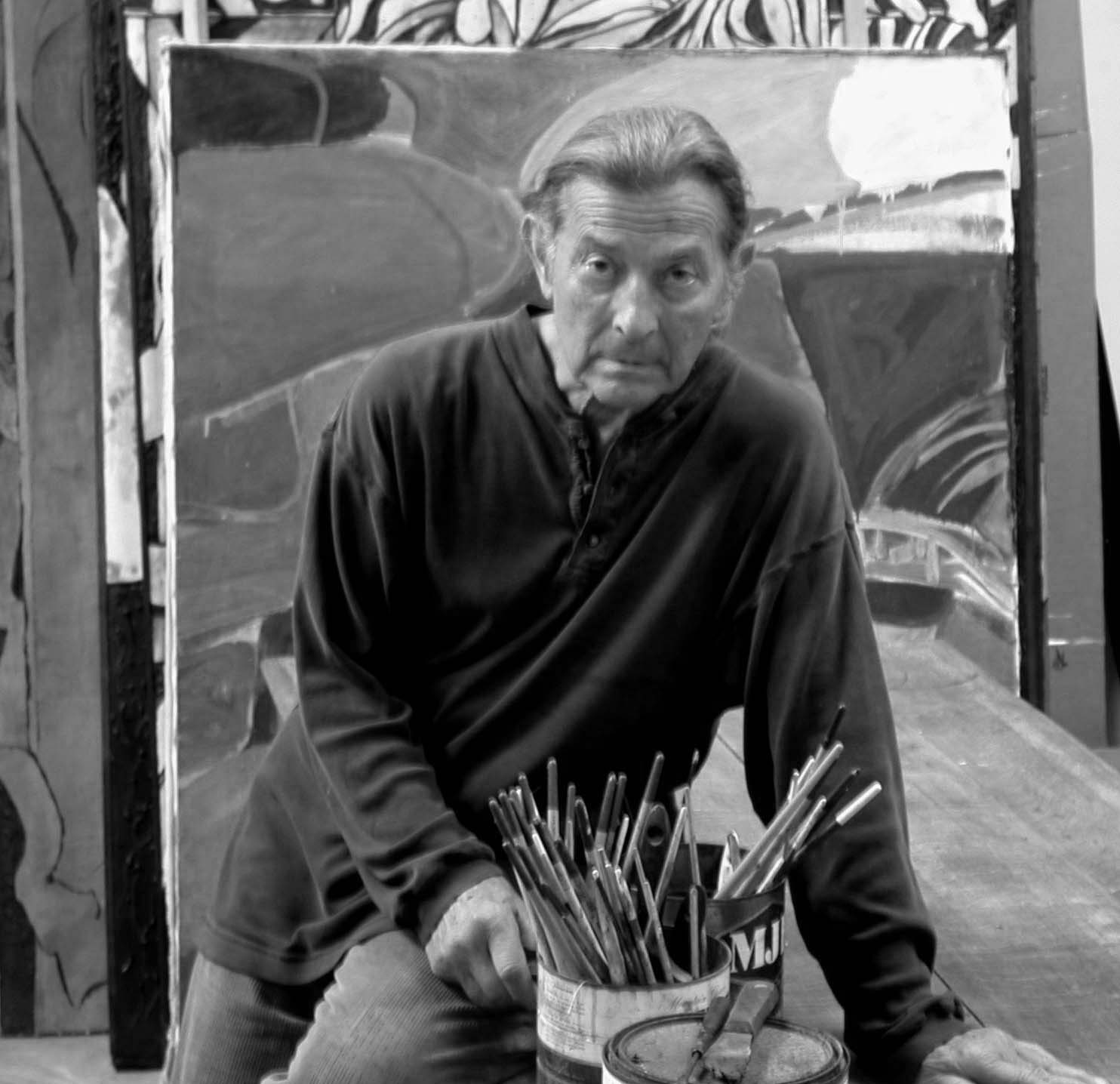
James Jarvaise (1924–2015)

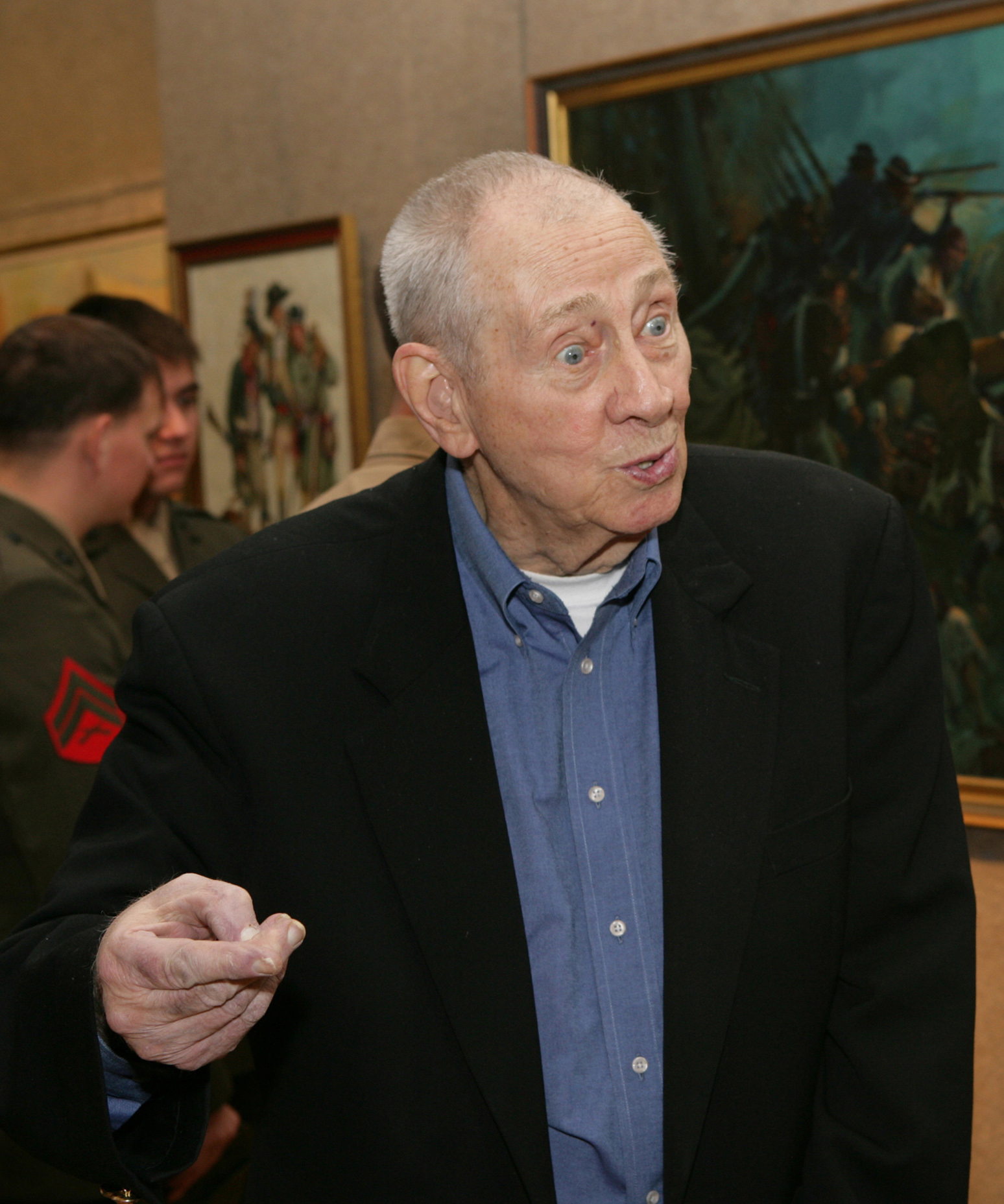
Charles Waterhouse (1924–2013)

- John Bageris (d. 2000), artist
- Al Blaustein (d. 2004), painter, printmaker
- George Brecht (d. 2008), Fluxus artist, composer
- Gandy Brodie (d. 1975), painter
- Robert Frank (d. 2019), filmmaker, photographer
- Jane Freilicher (d. 2014), painter
- Michael Goldberg (d. 2007), painter
- Douglas Huebler (d. 1997), conceptual artist
- James Jarvaise (d. 2015), painter
- Chris Karras (d. 2014), painter
- LaVerne Krause (d. 1987), printmaker, painter
- John Levee (d. 2017), painter
- Kenneth Noland (d. 2010), painter
- Philip Pearlstein (d. 2022), painter, printmaker
- Beverly Pepper (d. 2020), sculptor, painter
- George Segal (d. 2000), sculptor
- Kendall Shaw (d. 2019), painter
- Peter Voulkos (d. 2002), ceramist
- Charles Waterhouse (d. 2013), painter, illustrator, sculptor
- Jane Wilson (d. 2015), painter

=== 1925 ===
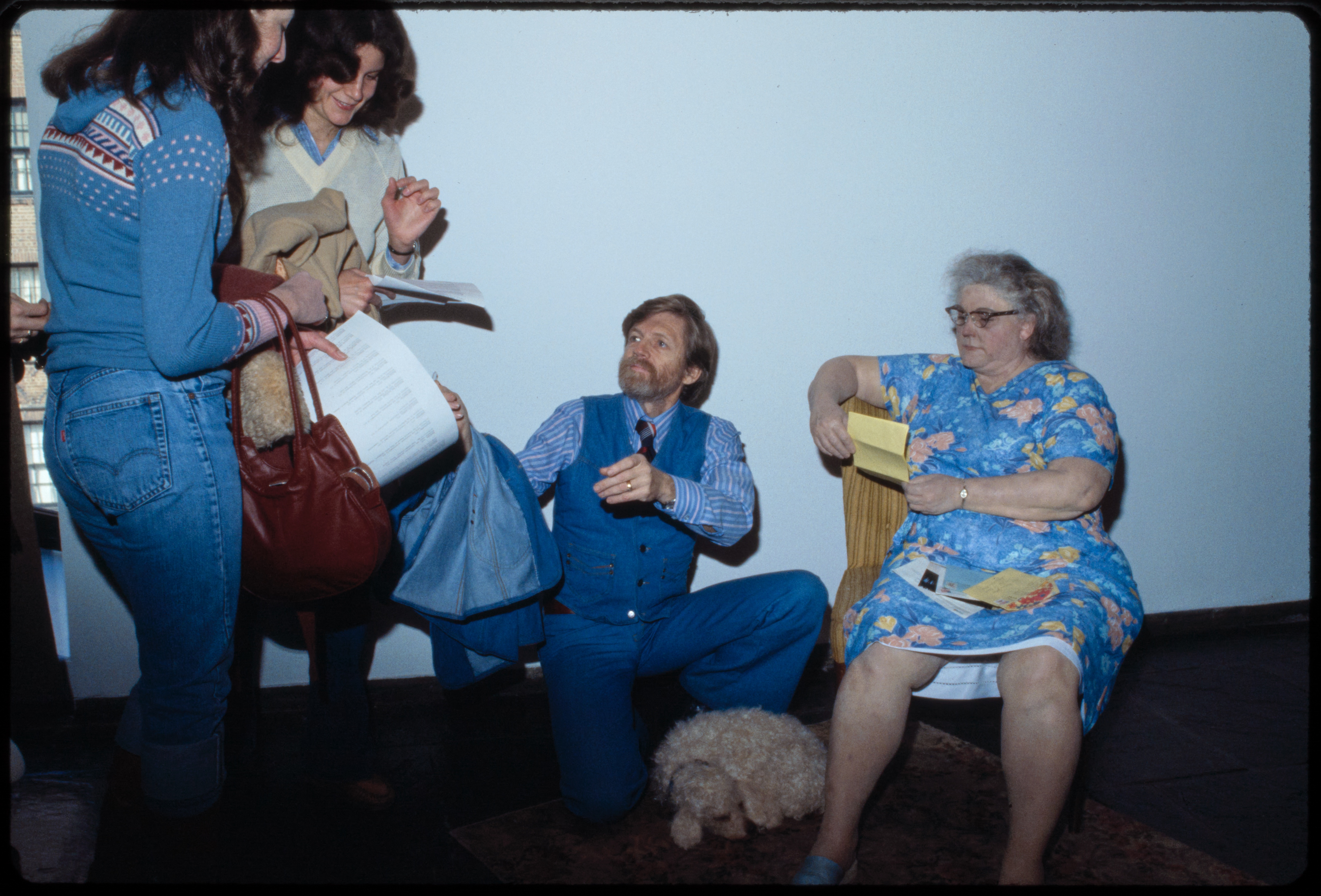
Duane Hanson (1925–1996)

- John Altoon (d. 1969), painter
- Karl Benjamin (d. 2012), painter
- Robert Colescott (d. 2009), painter
- Nita Engle (d. 2019), watercolorist
- Len Gridley Everett (d. 1984), painter
- Joseph Glasco (d. 1996), draftsman, painter, sculptor
- Duane Hanson (d. 1996), sculptor
- Lila Katzen (d. 1998), sculptor
- Joan Mitchell (d. 1992), painter, printmaker
- Robert Rauschenberg (d. 2008), painter, graphic artist
- Sam Spanier (d. 2008), painter, actor
- Emmett Williams (d. 2007), collage artist, concrete poet

=== 1926 ===
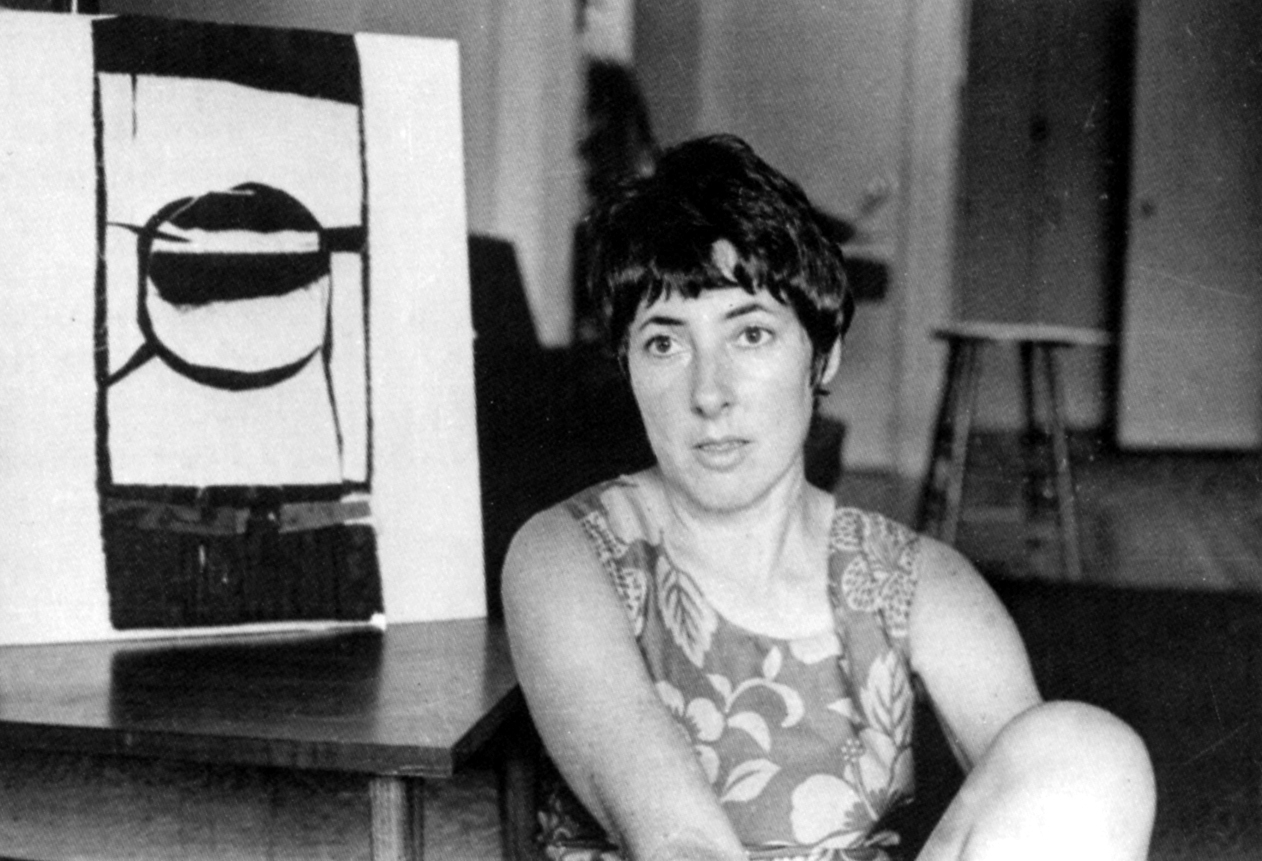
Hannelore Baron (1926–1987)

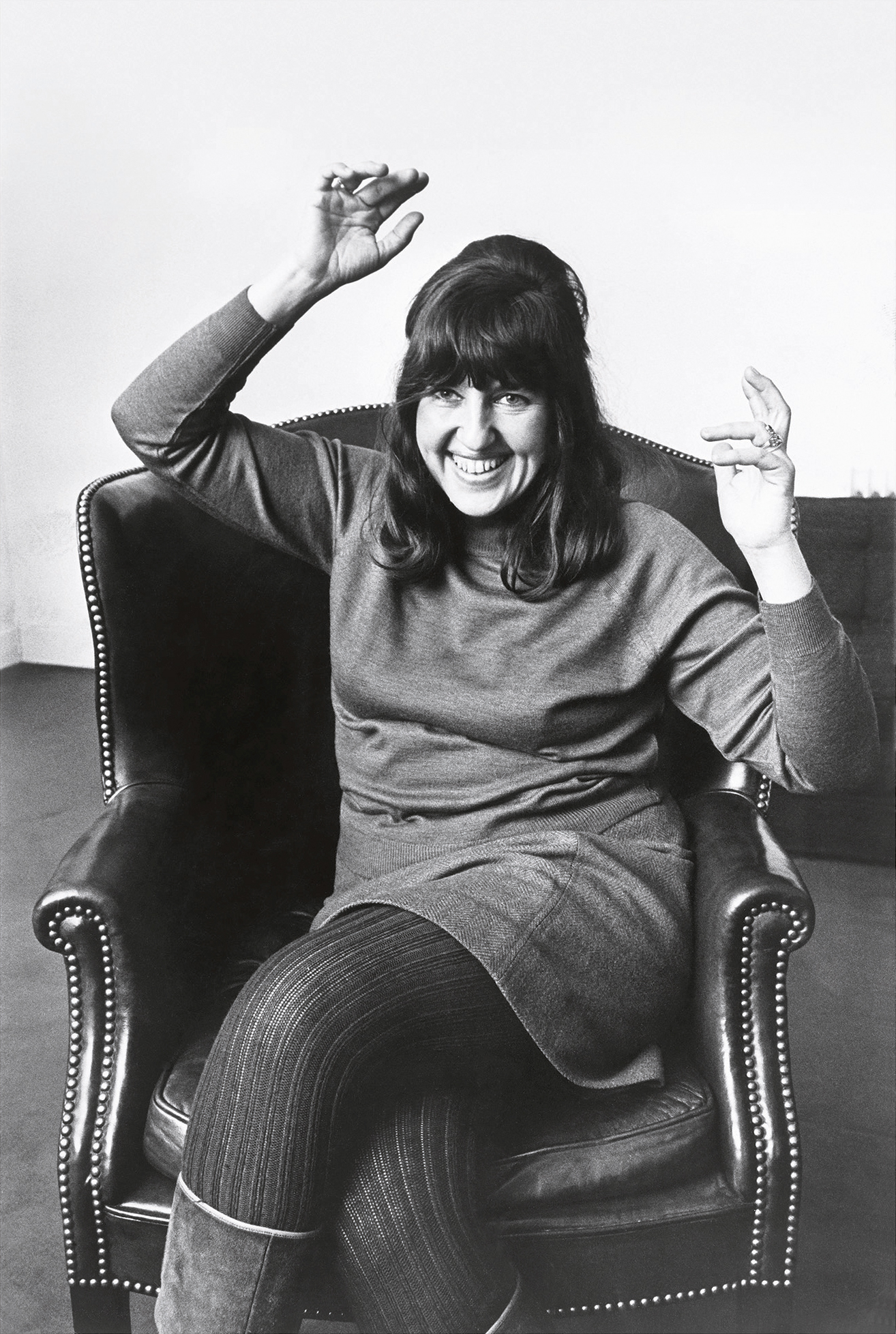
Rosalyn Drexler (1926-2025)

- Satoru Abe (d. 2025), sculptor, painter
- Stephen Antonakos (d. 2013), Greek-born sculptor, light artist
- Hannelore Baron (d. 1987), collage artist
- Wallace Berman (d. 1976), assemblage artist
- Stanley Boxer (d. 2000), painter
- Edward Clark (d. 2019), painter
- Brian Connelly (d. 1963), painter
- Rosalyn Drexler (d. 2025), painter
- Sonia Gechtoff (d. 2018), painter
- Everett Raymond Kinstler (d. 2019), painter
- Ellen Lanyon (d. 2013), painter
- Ed Moses (d. 2018), painter
- Elva Nampeyo (d. 1985), potter, ceramist
- George Earl Ortman (d. 2015), painter
- Roland Petersen, Danish-born painter
- Betye Saar (d. 2026), assemblage artist
- Charles Seliger (d. 2009), painter
- Nancy Spero (d. 2009), painter, printmaker, collage artist
- Don Stivers (d. 2009), painter
- Beth Van Hoesen (d. 2010), printmaker
- Jack Youngerman (d. 2020), painter

=== 1927 ===
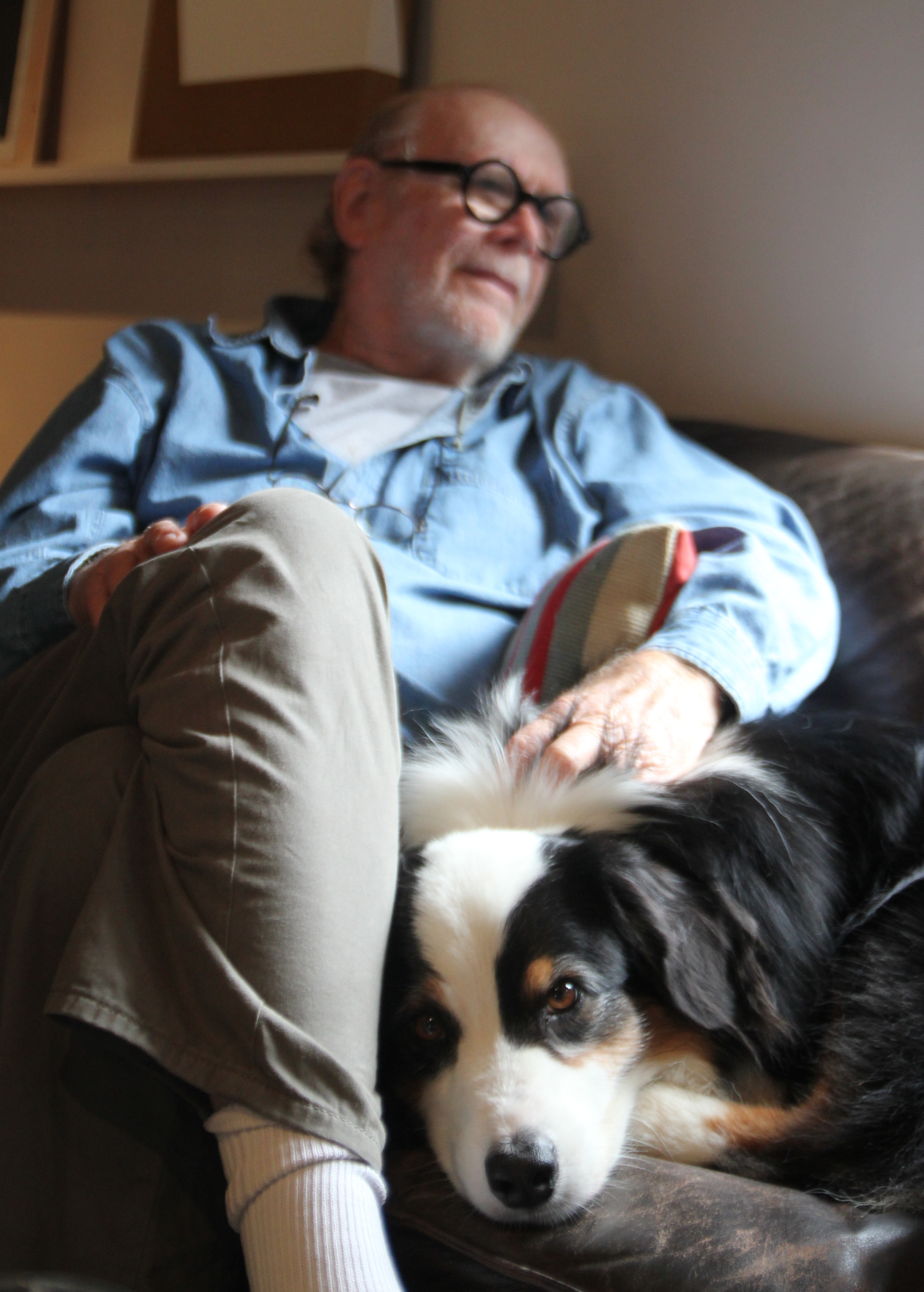
Tony DeLap (1927–2019)

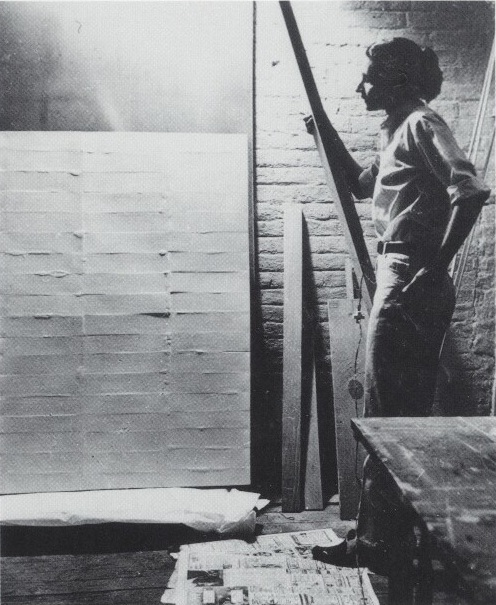
Eleanore Mikus (1927–2017)

- James Bishop (d. 2021), painter
- Jack Boul (d. 2024), painter, sculptor, printmaker
- Lilian Thomas Burwell, painter, sculptor
- Richard Callner (d. 2007), painter
- John Chamberlain (d. 2011), sculptor
- Tony DeLap (d. 2019), sculptor
- Peter Forakis (d. 2009), sculptor
- Al Hansen (d. 1995), performance artist, collage artist, Fluxus artist
- Ray Johnson (d. 1995), collage artist, mail artist
- Wolf Kahn (d. 2020), painter
- Allan Kaprow (d. 2006), painter, assemblagist, performance artist
- Alex Katz, painter, printmaker
- Edward Kienholz (d. 1994), installation artist, sculptor
- Alfred Leslie (d. 2023), painter
- John Mason (d. 2019), ceramist
- Eleanore Mikus (d. 2017), painter
- Jack Roth (d. 2004), painter
- William Scharf (d. 2018), painter
- Lillian Schwartz (d. 2024), digital artist
- Kenneth Snelson (d. 2016), sculptor
- Anne Tabachnick (d. 1995), painter
- John Paul Thomas (d. 2001), painter
- Reynolds Thomas (d. 1991), painter
- Ernest Trova (d. 2009), sculptor

=== 1928 ===
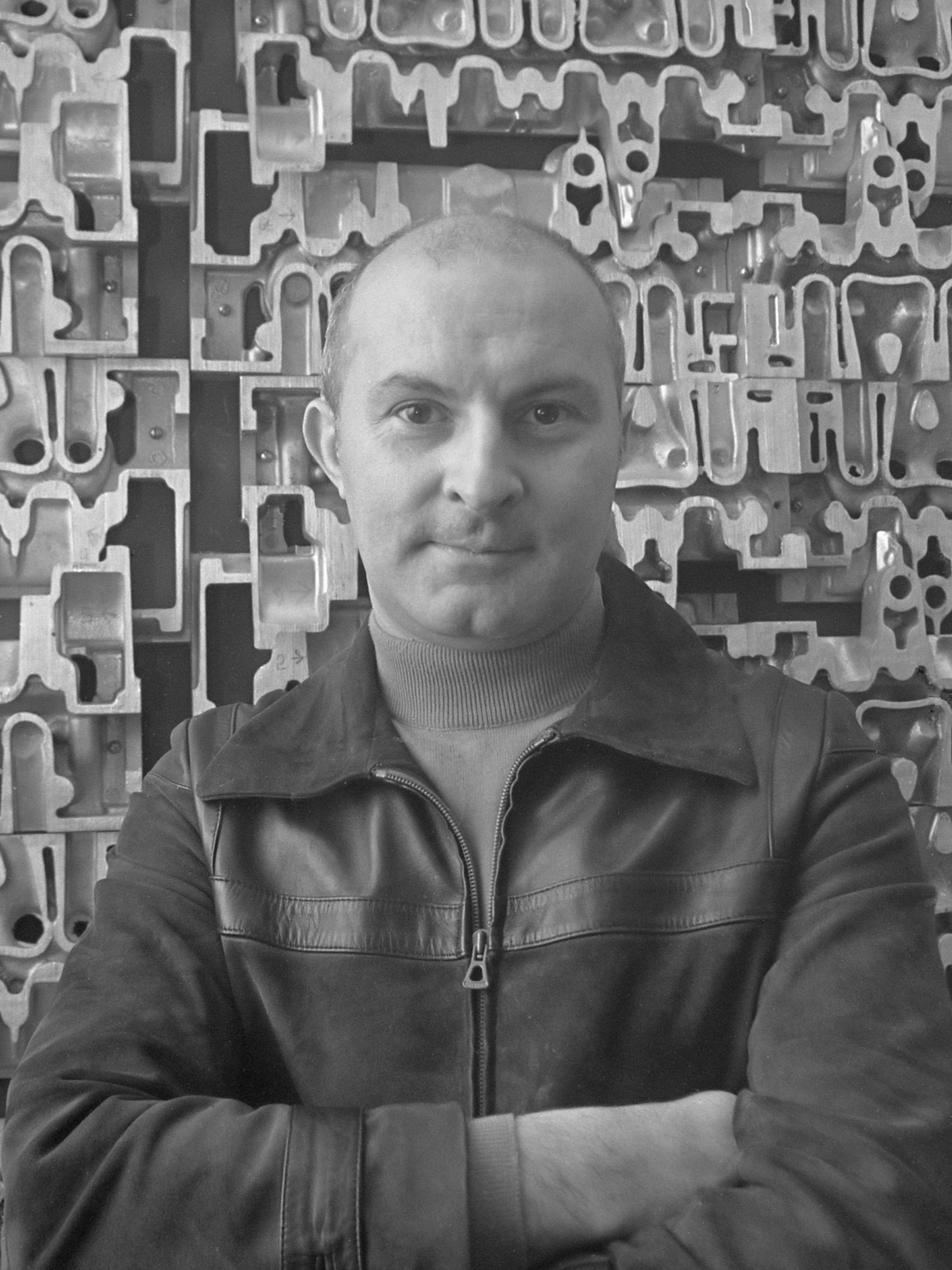
Arman (1928–2005)

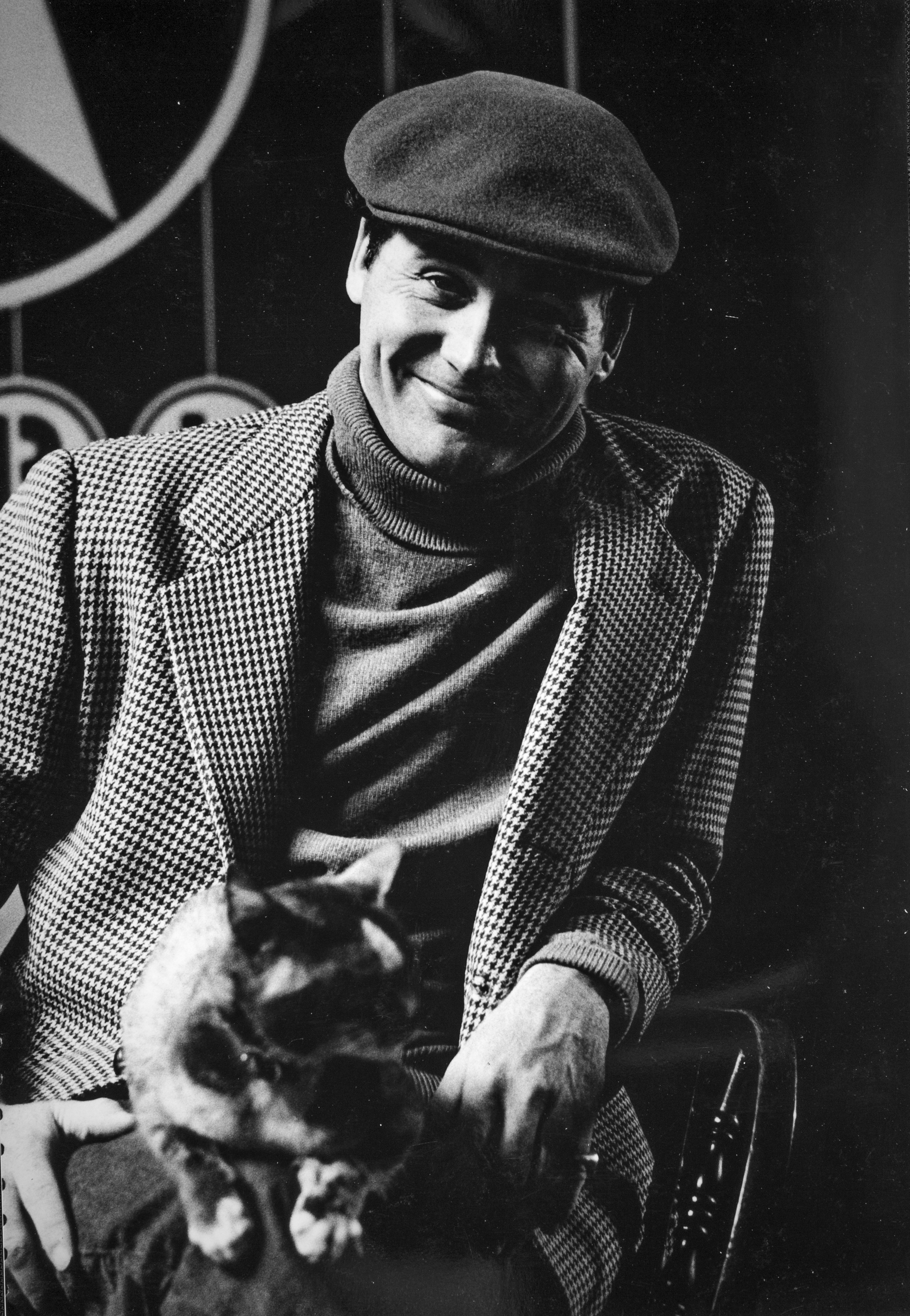
Robert Indiana (1928–2018)

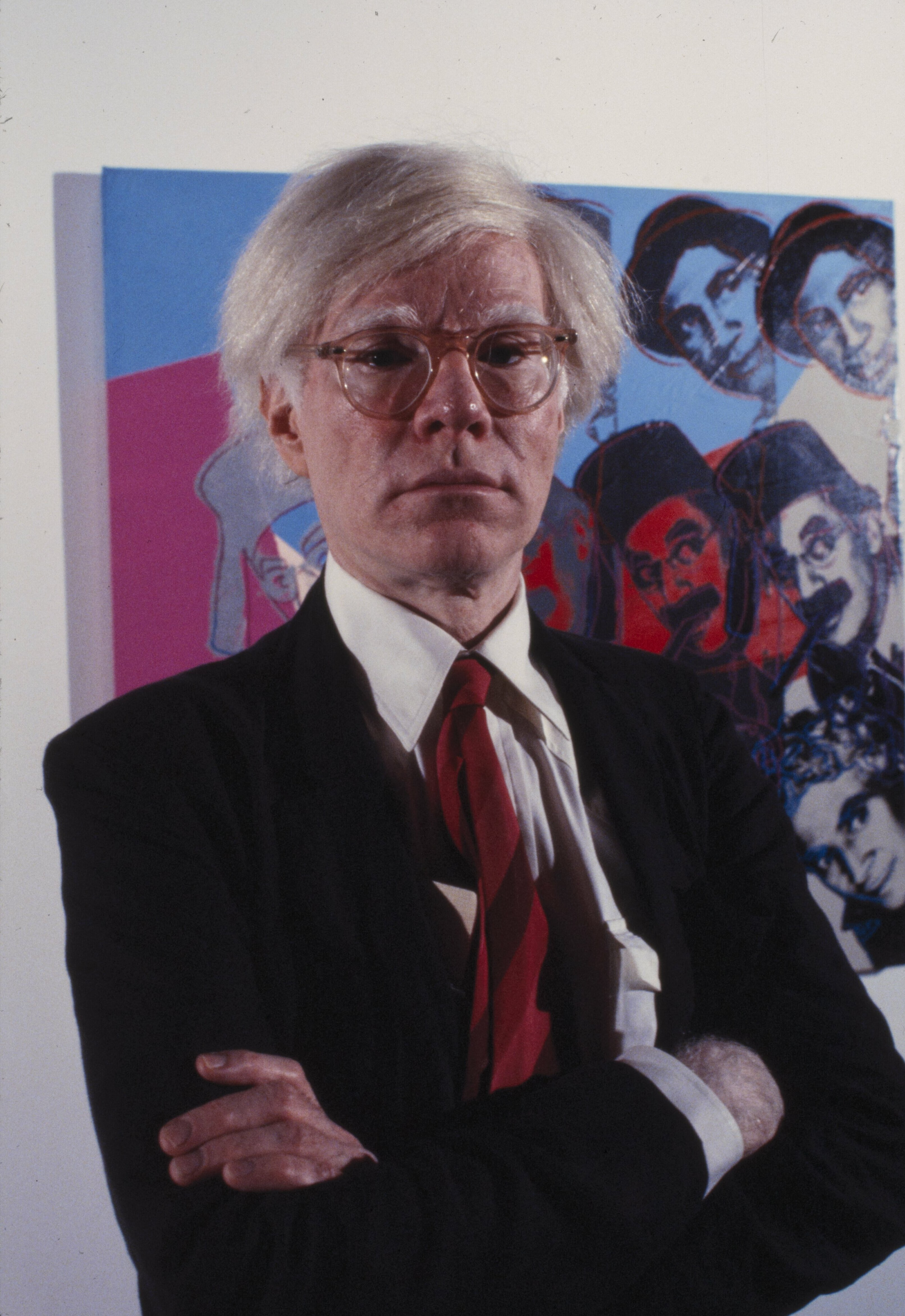
Andy Warhol (1928–1987)

- Pat Adams, painter
- Arman (d. 2005), French-born painter, sculptor, experimental artist
- Alice Baber (d. 1982), painter
- Yoong Bae (d. 1992), painter, sculptor
- Allyn Bromley, printmaker
- Rolando López Dirube (d. 1997), artist
- Thomas Downing (d. 1985), painter
- Ken Ferguson (d. 2005), ceramist
- Helen Frankenthaler (d. 2011), painter, printmaker
- Ralph Goings (d. 2016), painter
- Wally Hedrick (d. 2003), painter, collage artist
- Al Held (d. 2005), painter, printmaker
- Robert Indiana (d. 2018), painter, sculptor, printmaker
- Robert Irwin (d. 2023), installation artist
- Donald Judd (d. 1994), sculptor
- Sol LeWitt (d. 2007), conceptual artist, installation artist, sculptor, printmaker
- Brian O'Doherty, a.k.a. Patrick Ireland (d. 2022), sculptor, painter, installation artist, conceptual artist
- Nathan Oliveira (d. 2010), painter, printmaker
- Pat Passlof (d. 2011), painter
- Wendell Thompson Perkins (d. 1997), painter
- Dextra Nampeyo Quotskuyva (d. 2019), potter, ceramist
- Paul Resika, painter
- Betty Sabo (d. 2016), landscape painter, sculptor
- David Simpson, painter
- Julian Stanczak (d. 2017), painter
- Anthony Triano (d. 1997), painter, sculptor, illustrator
- Wen-Ying Tsai (d. 2013), sculptor
- Cy Twombly (d. 2011), painter, sculptor
- Andy Warhol (d. 1987), painter, filmmaker, printmaker
- John Wesley (d. 2022), painter

=== 1929 ===
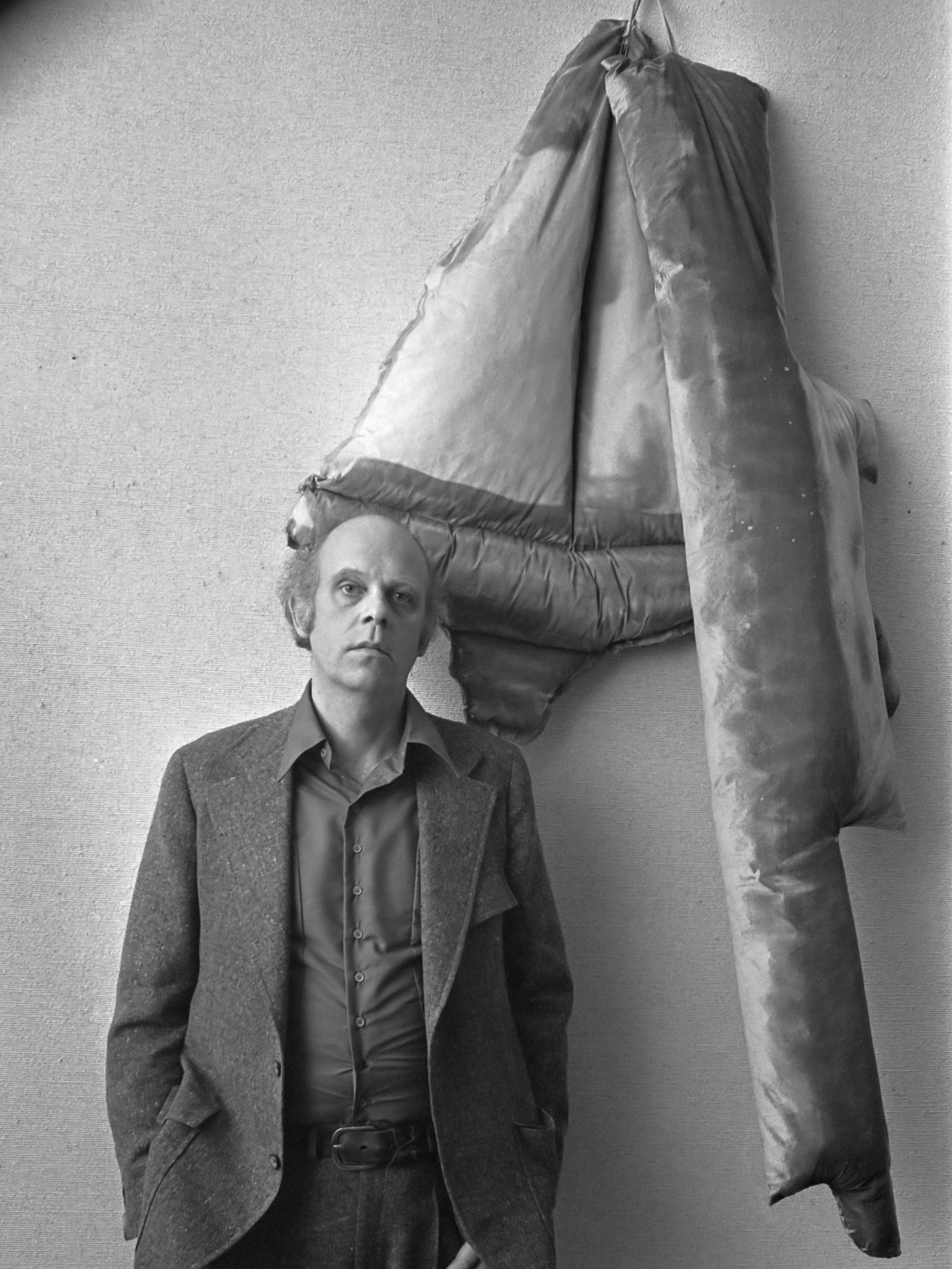
Claes Oldenburg (1929–2022)

- Ida Applebroog (d. 2023), painter
- Jo Baer (d. 2025), painter
- John Button (d. 1982), painter
- Robert d'Arista (d. 1987), painter
- Jay DeFeo (d. 1989), painter, visual artist
- Jules Feiffer (d. 2025), cartoonist
- Jackie Ferrara, (d. 2025), sculptor
- Vassilios Giavis (d. 2019), historical illustrator
- Wadsworth Jarrell, painter
- Howard Kanovitz (d. 2009), painter
- Lyman Kipp (d. 2014), sculptor
- Nicholas Krushenick (d. 1999), painter
- Gabriel Laderman (d. 2011), painter
- Clement Meadmore (d. 2005), sculptor
- Claes Oldenburg (d. 2022), sculptor
- Charles O. Perry (d. 2011), sculptor
- Raquel Rabinovich (d. 2025), painter, sculptor
- Dorothea Rockburne, painter
- Mary Lou Romney (d. 2003), painter, illustrator, educator
- Neil Welliver (d. 2005), painter

== Born 1930–1939 ==
=== 1930 ===
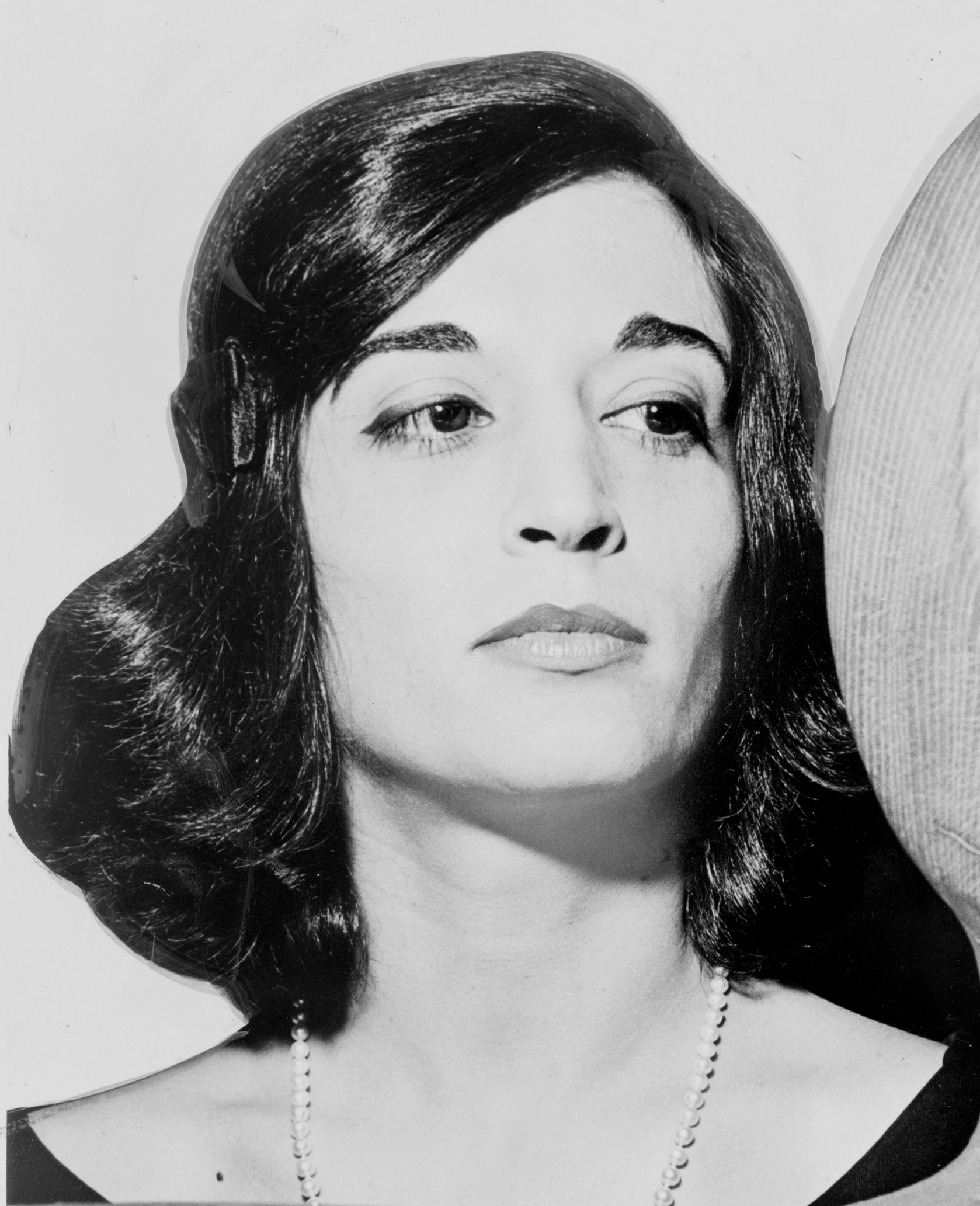
Marisol Escobar (1930–2016)

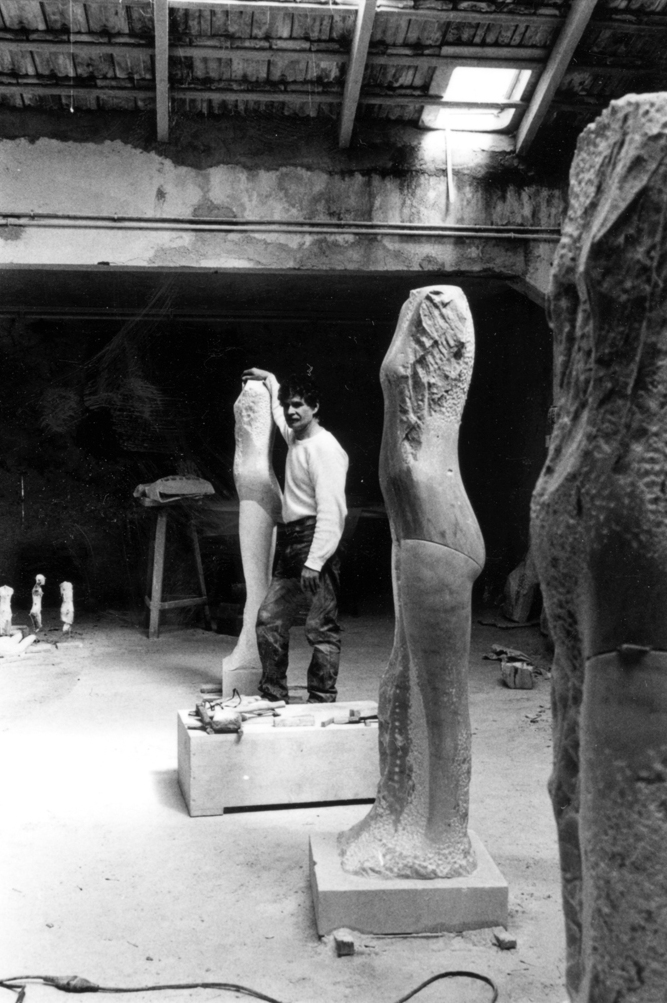
Manuel Neri (1930–2021)

- Richard Anuszkiewicz (d. 2020), painter, sculptor, printmaker
- Robert Arneson (d. 1992), sculptor, ceramist
- William H. Bailey (d. 2020), painter
- James E. Brewton (d. 1967), painter, printmaker
- Harold Bruder, realist painter
- Annette Corcoran, graphic artist, ceramist
- Allan D'Arcangelo (d. 1998), painter, graphic artist, printmaker
- Marisol Escobar (d. 2016), sculptor, printmaker
- Helen Frank, painter, printmaker
- Judith Godwin (d. 2021), painter
- Ron Gorchov (d. 2020), painter
- Jasper Johns, painter, sculptor, printmaker
- Ken Kerslake (d. 2006), printmaker, painter
- Howard Kottler (d. 1989), ceramist, sculpture
- Lee Lozano (d. 1999), painter
- Robert Natkin (d. 2010), painter
- Manuel Neri (d. 2021), sculptor, painter
- Walter Pashko (d. 2006), surrealism
- Deborah Remington (d. 2010), painter, printmaker
- Faith Ringgold (d. 2024), painter, fabric artist
- Robert Ryman (d. 2019), painter
- Anita Steckel (d. 2012), graphic artist
- Susan Weil, painter
- Gahan Wilson (d. 2019), cartoonist

=== 1931 ===
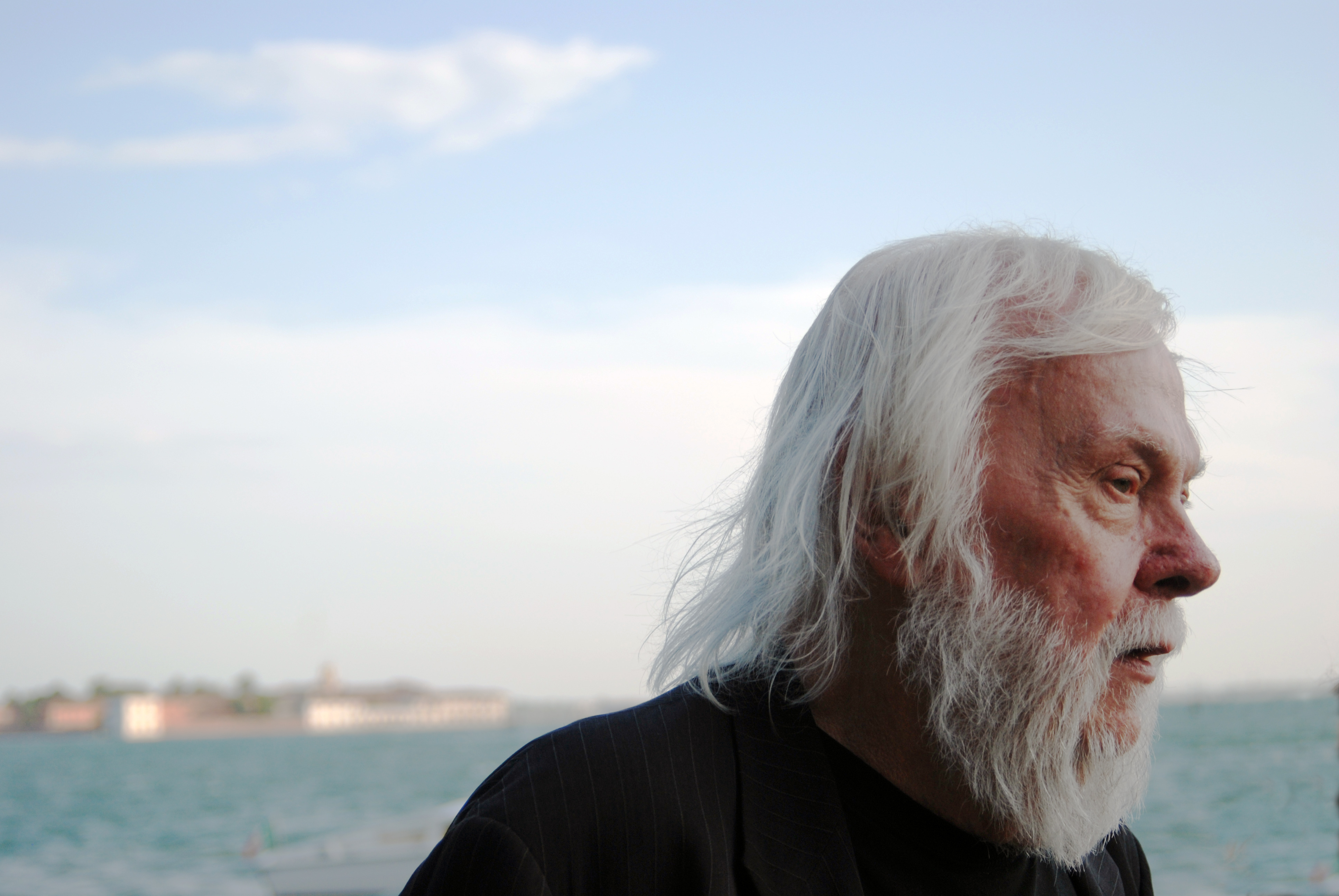
John Baldessari (1931–2020)

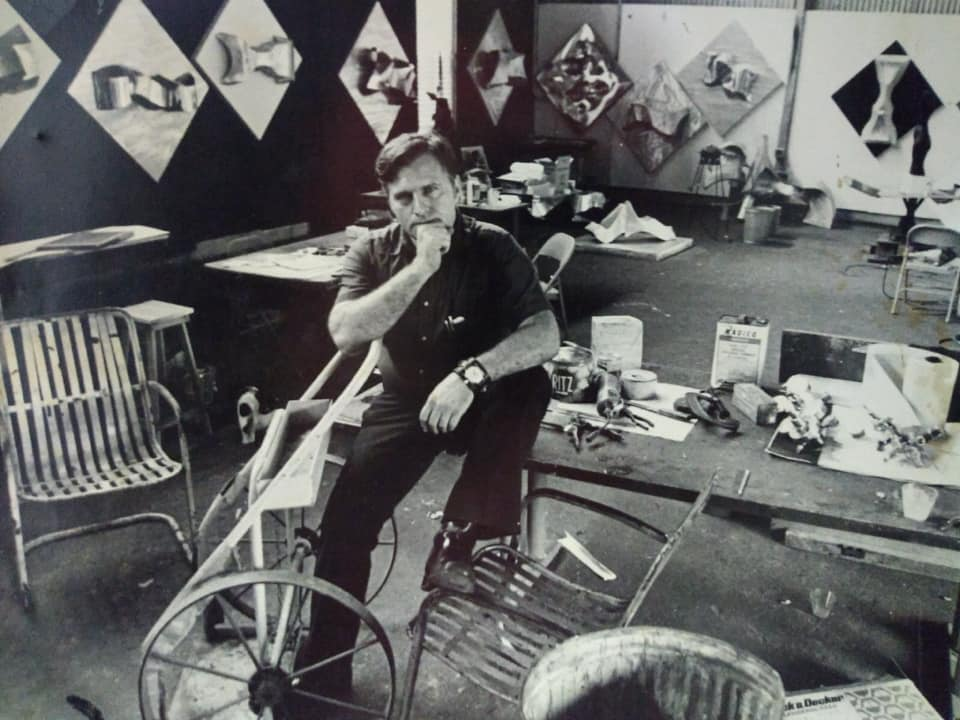
John Balossi (1931–2007)

- Helene Aylon, (d. 2020), painter
- John Baldessari (d. 2020), conceptual artist, printmaker
- John Balossi (d. 2007), painter, sculptor
- John Nelson Battenberg (d. 2012)
- Jack Beal (d. 2013), painter
- Lee Bontecou (d. 2022), sculptor, printmaker
- Stan Dann (d. 2013), wood sculptor
- Audrey Flack (d. 2024), painter
- Rolland Golden (d. 2019), abstract realist painter
- R.C. Gorman (d. 2005), painter
- Raymond Han (d. 2017), painter
- Fred Holle, artist, educator
- Budd Hopkins (d. 2011), painter
- Howard Mehring (d. 1978), painter
- Malcolm Morley (d. 2019), painter, printmaker
- Robert Morris (d. 2019), sculptor, conceptual artist
- Christopher Ross (d. 2023), sculptor
- Marjorie Strider (d. 2014), sculptor
- Tom Wesselmann (d. 2004), painter, collage artist

=== 1932 ===
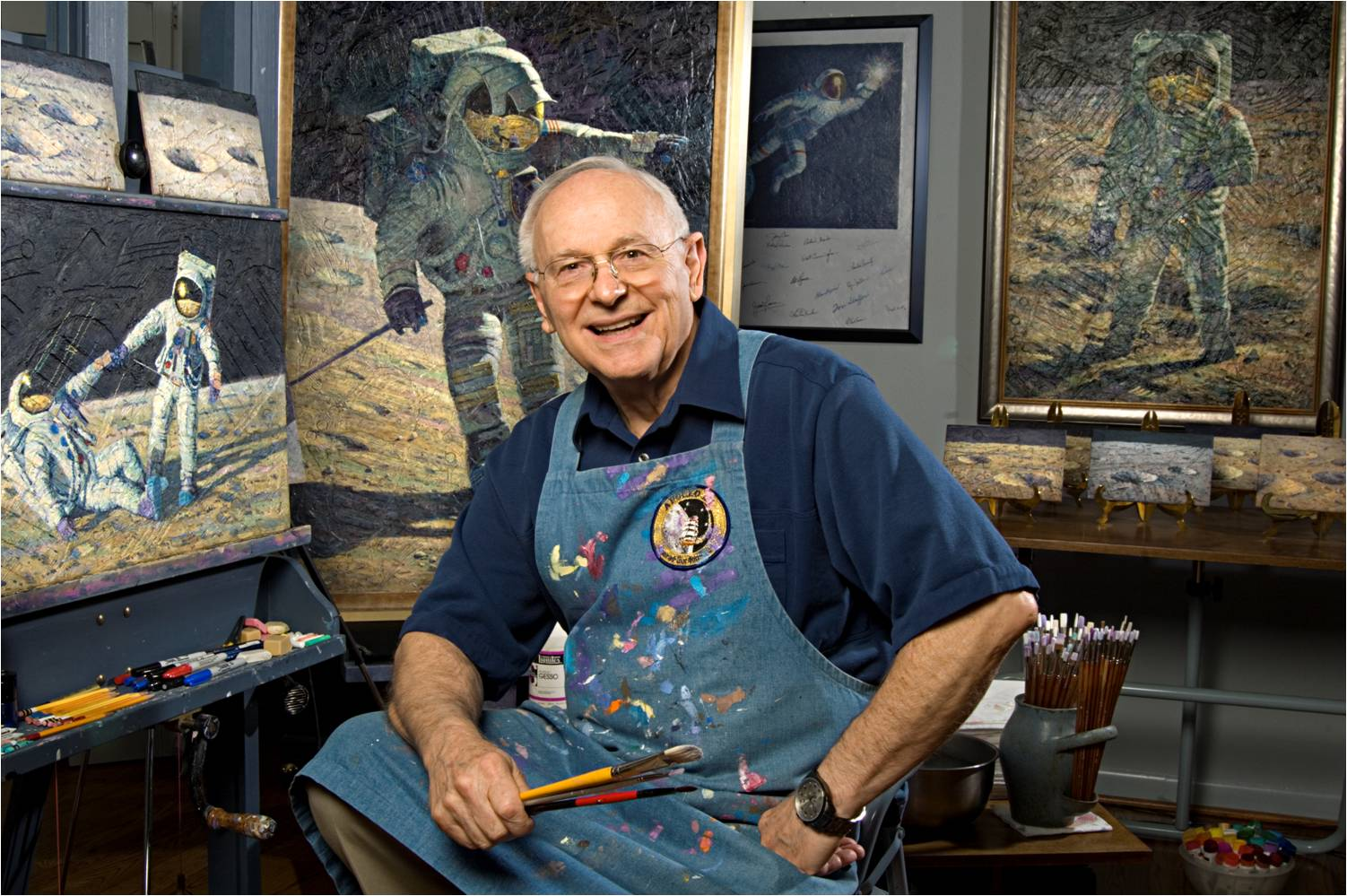
Alan Bean (1932–2018)

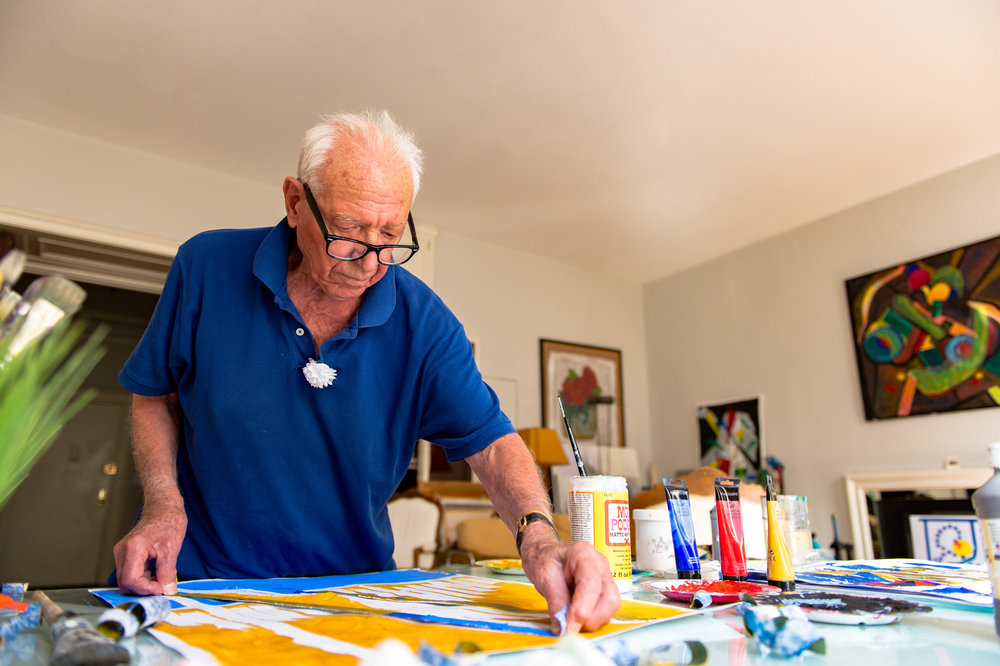
Ron Ferri (1932–2019)

- Alan Bean (d. 2018), former astronaut, painter
- Robert Bechtle (d. 2020), painter
- Emilie Benes Brzezinski (d. 2022), sculptor
- James Lee Byars (d. 1997), installation artist, sculptor, performance artist
- Richard Estes, painter, printmaker
- Ron Ferri (d. 2019), digital artist
- Charles Hinman, (d. 2026), painter
- Morris Katz (d. 2010), painter
- Craig Kauffman (d. 2010), painter, sculptor
- Emily Mason (d. 2019), painter
- Nora Chapa Mendoza, abstract painter
- Nam June Paik (d. 2006), Fluxus, installation artist
- Harry Tsuchidana, abstract painter

=== 1933 ===
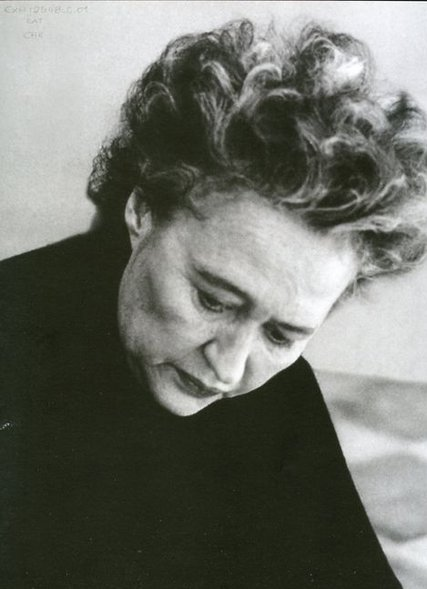
Chryssa (1933–2013)

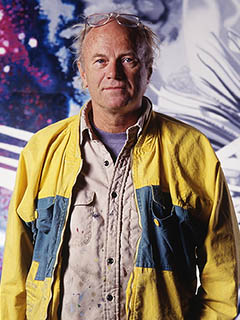
James Rosenquist (1933–2017)

- William Anastasi (d. 2023), painter
- George Bogart (d. 2005), painter
- Kenneth Wayne Bushnell (d. 2020), visual artist
- Albert Contreras (d. 2017), painter
- Chryssa (d. 2013), sculptor
- Guy Coheleach, painter
- Bruce Conner (d. 2008), filmmaker, assemblage artist, sculptor, painter, collagist, graphic artist, photographer
- Mary Beth Edelson (d. 2021), artist
- Dale Eldred (d. 1993), sculptor
- Dan Flavin (d. 1996), sculptor
- Sam Gilliam (d. 2022), painter, printmaker
- Carol Haerer (d. 2002), painter
- Phillip Hefferton (d. 2008), pop artist
- John Stuart Ingle (d. 2010), watercolorist
- Alison Knowles, Fluxus performance artist, sound artist, papermaker, printmaker
- Charlotte Moorman (d. 1991), Fluxus, performance artist
- Ree Morton (d. 1977), painter, sculptor
- Yoko Ono, installation artist, sculptor, filmmaker
- Joseph Raffael (d. 2021), painter
- James Rosenquist (d. 2017), painter, muralist, printmaker
- Joe Shannon, painter
- Stephen De Staebler (d. 2011), sculptor
- Michelle Stuart, painter, sculptor, photographer
- Mark di Suvero, sculptor
- Paul Thek (d. 1988), installation, painting, sculpture

=== 1934 ===
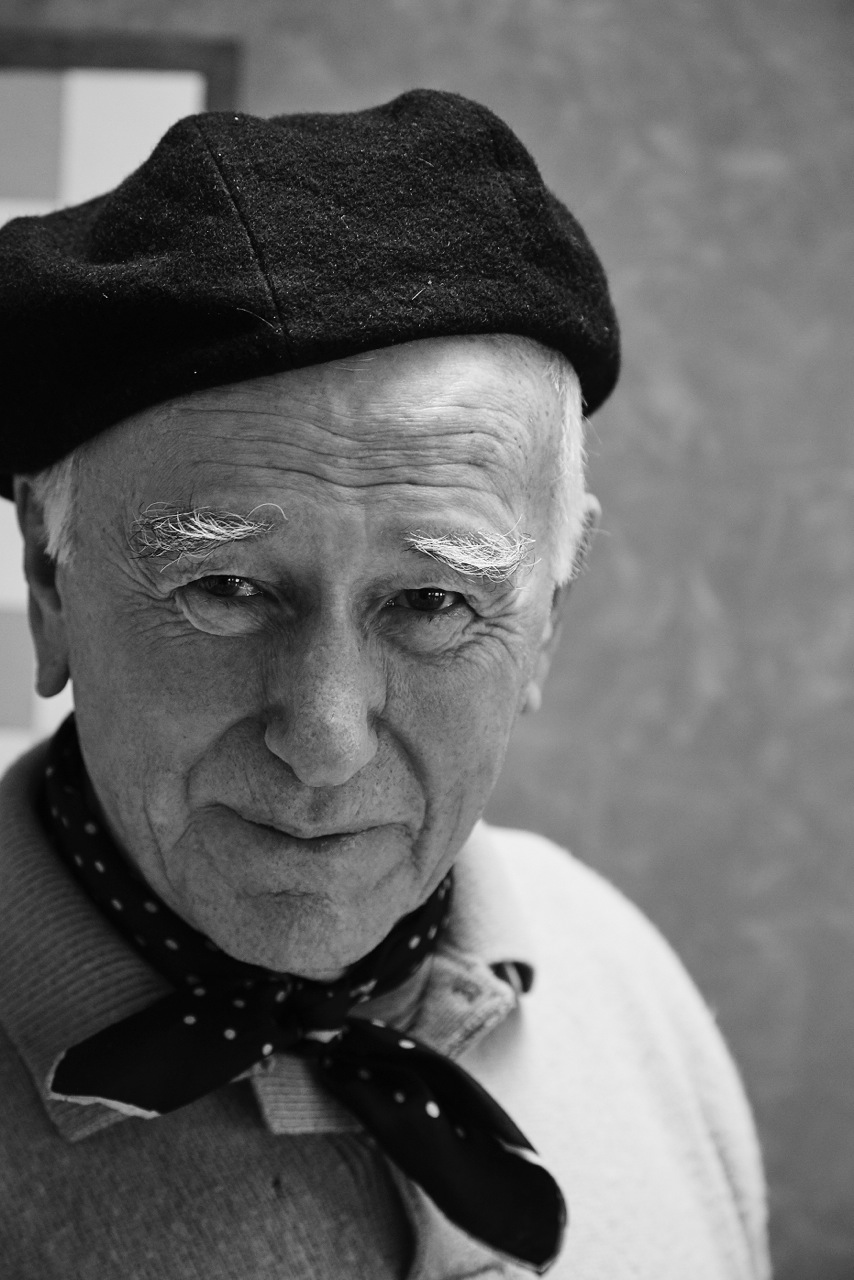
Billy Al Bengston (1934–2022)

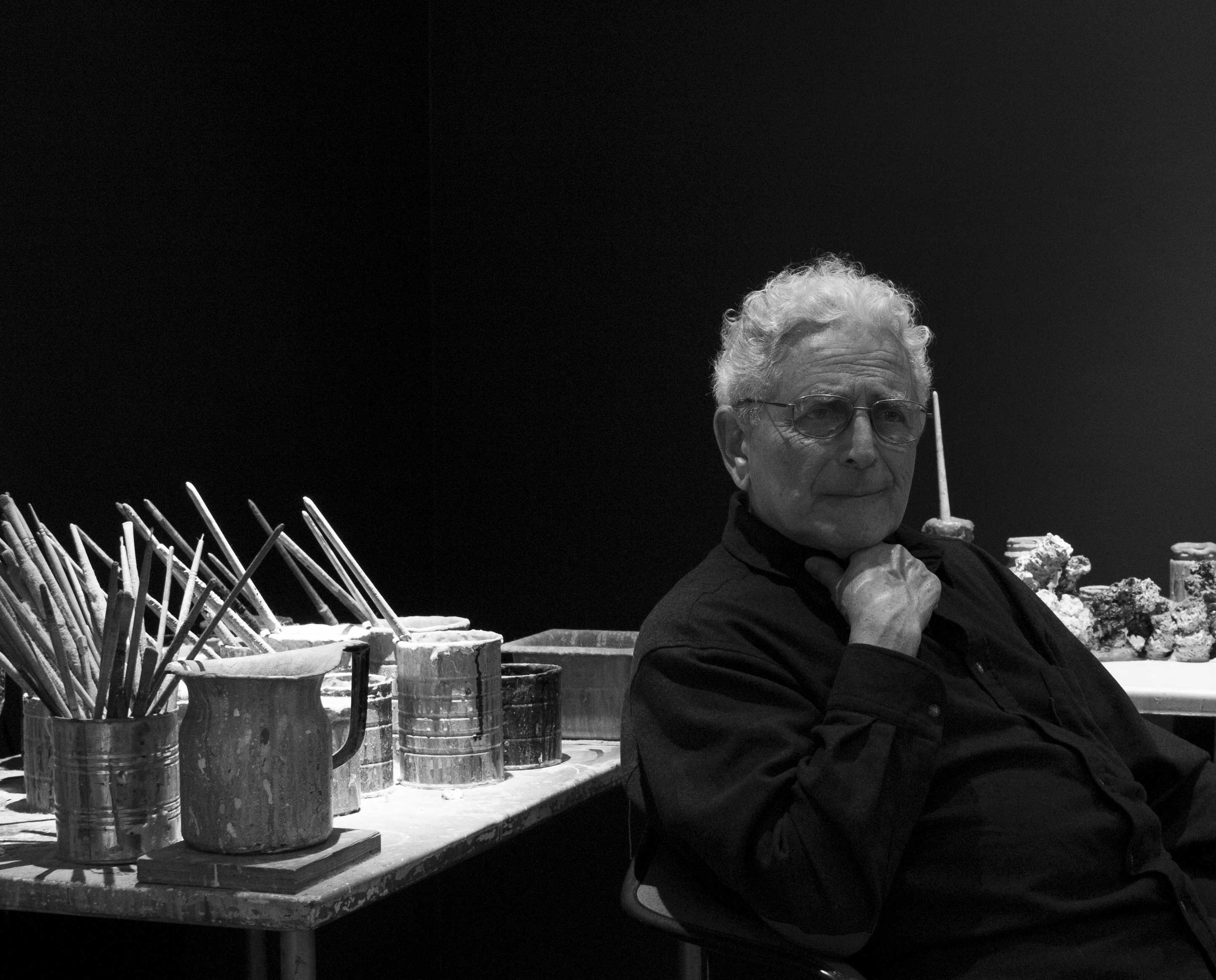
Irving Petlin (1934–2018)

- Don Bachardy, portrait artist
- Colette Bangert, new media artist
- Walter Darby Bannard (d. 2016), painter
- Bill Barrett, sculptor, painter
- Billy Al Bengston (d. 2022), painter, sculptor
- Helen Bershad, abstract expressionist painter
- Llyn Foulkes, painter
- James Gill, painter
- Anita Huffington (d. 2025), sculptor
- Yvonne Jacquette (d. 2023), painter, printmaker
- Joni T. Johnson (d. 1988), painter
- John McCracken (d. 2011), sculptor
- Jay Milder, (d.2026), painter
- Forrest Moses (d. 2021), abstract landscape painter
- Irving Petlin (d. 2018), painter
- Gloria Plevin, painter
- Yvonne Rainer, performance artist, choreographer, dancer
- Peter Saul, painter
- Selina Trieff (d. 2015), abstract artist
- Harold Joe Waldrum (d. 2003), painter, photographer
- Neil Williams (d. 1988), painter

=== 1935 ===
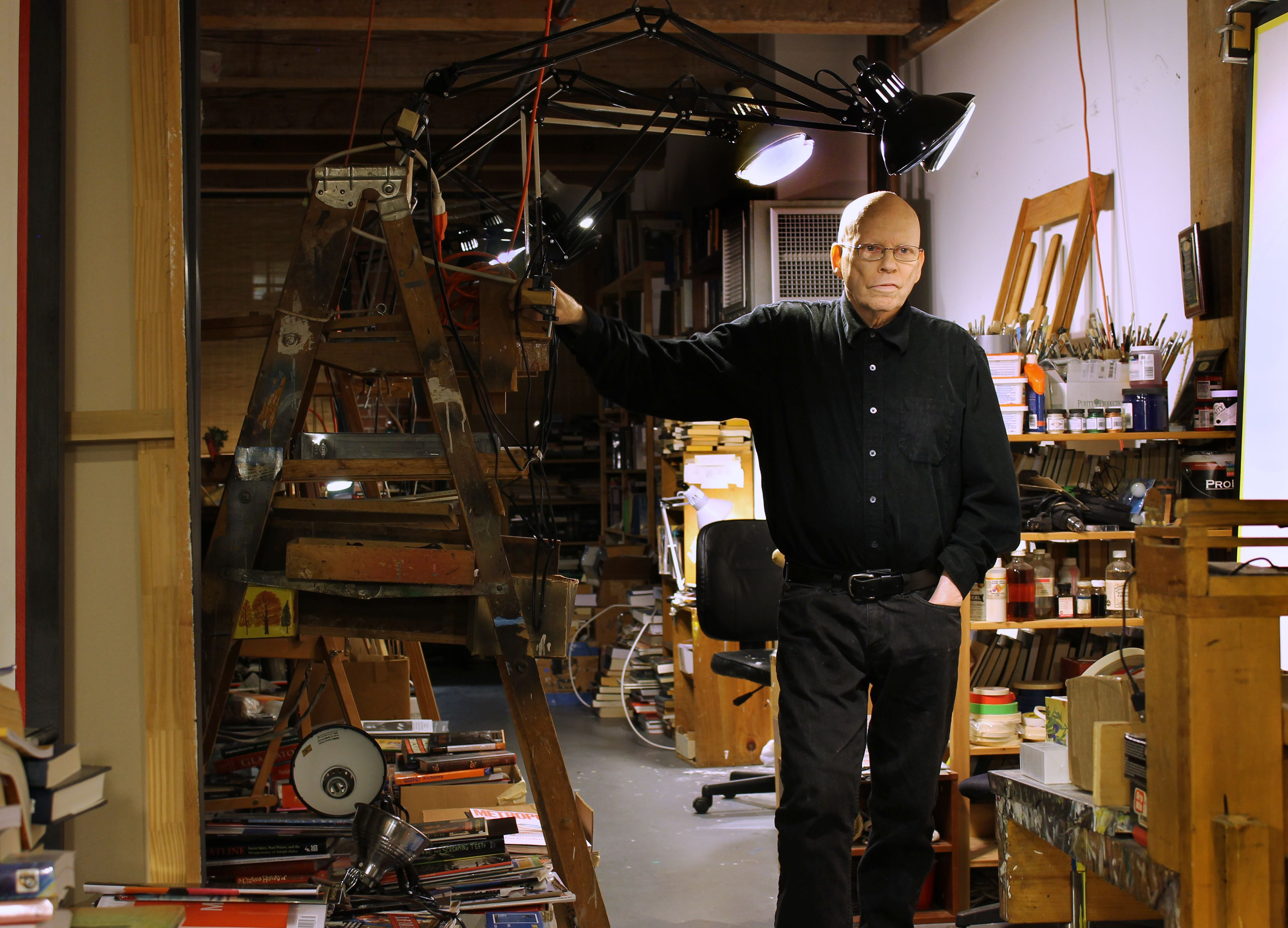
Paul Laffoley (1935–2015)

- Carl Andre (d. 2024), minimalist sculptor
- Eleanor Antin, performance artist, filmmaker, installation artist
- Emilija Bucik Razman (1935–2024), painter and illustrator
- Christo (d. 2020), environmental installation artist
- Walter De Maria (d. 2013), sculptor
- Jim Dine, painter, sculptor, printmaker
- Richard Hunt (d. 2023), sculptor
- Simmie Knox, portrait artist
- Paul Laffoley (d. 2015), artist
- Alvin D. Loving (d. 2005), abstract expressionist painter
- Ben Fortunado Marcune, figurative, representational sculptor, painter
- Chuck Oberstein (d. 2002), clown paintings
- Kenneth Price (d. 2012), ceramist
- Joseph Rael, artist, writer
- Mel Ramos (d. 2018), abstract and nude painter
- Hib Sabin, sculptor
- Stanley Tomshinsky (d. 2004), artist
- Diane Tuckman (d. 2024), silk painter
- Carol Wald (d. 2000), artist, illustrator

=== 1936 ===
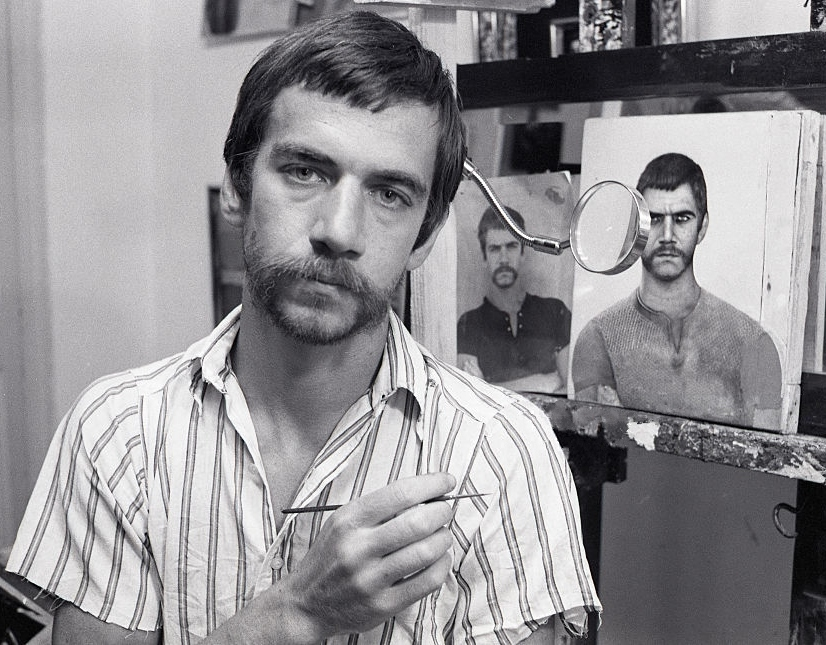
Gregory Gillespie (1936–2000)

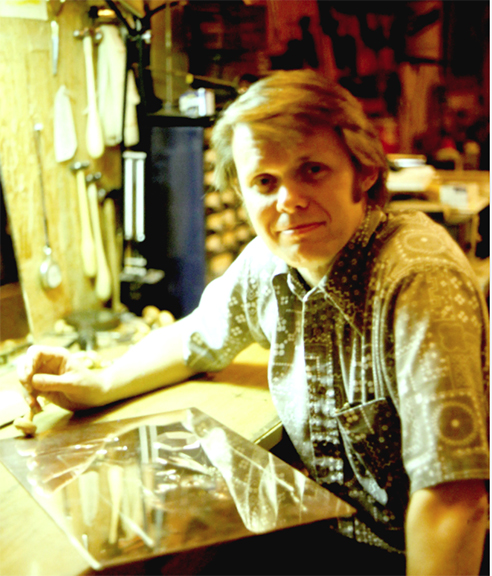
Evan Lindquist (1936–2023)

- Edward Avedisian (d. 2007), painter
- Hollis Frampton (d. 1984), experimental filmmaker, photographer, theorist
- Gregory Gillespie (d. 2000), painter
- Hans Haacke, conceptual artist
- Richard Haas, muralist
- Eva Hesse (d. 1970), sculptor
- Tom Holland, painter, mixed media
- Dennis Hopper (d. 2010), actor, photographer, painter, other media
- Bill Hutson (d. 2022), abstract fine artist
- Joan Jonas, video, performance artist, other media
- Evan Lindquist (d. 2023), printmaker
- Doug Ohlson (d. 2010), painter
- Richard Pionk (d. 2007), pastellist, painter
- Lucas Samaras (d. 2024), photographer, sculptor, printmaker
- Frank Stella (d. 2024), painter, printmaker
- DeWain Valentine (d. 2022), sculptor
- Leo Valledor (d. 1989), painter
- Carlos Villa (d. 2013), painter
- Thornton Willis (d. 2025), painter

=== 1937 ===
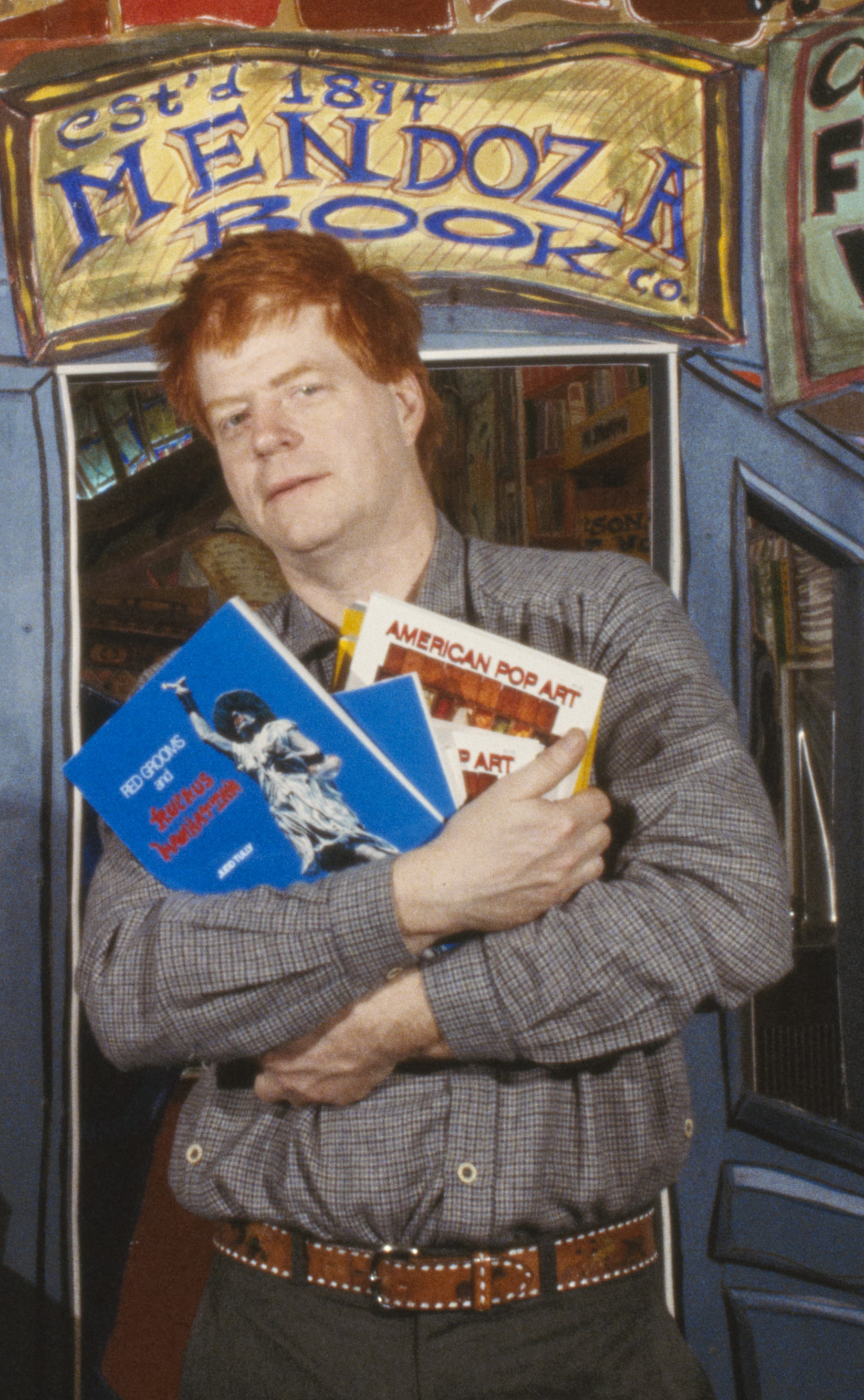
Red Grooms (born 1937)

- Peter Campus, video artist, photographer
- Reginald Case (d. 2009), painter, collagist, sculptor
- Ronald Davis, (d. 2025), painter
- Melvin Edwards (d. 2026), sculptor
- Eugene Gregan, painter
- Red Grooms, multimedia artist, printmaker
- Robert Grosvenor, (d. 2025), sculptor
- Carolyn Heller (d. 2011), painter, decorative artist
- LeRoy Johnson (d. 2022), painter, sculptor, collagist
- Blaine Gledhill Larson (d. 2022), painter, educator
- Robert Mangold, painter, printmaker
- Peter Max, German-born printmaker, graphic designer
- Marva Lee Pitchford-Jolly (d. 2012), ceramist
- Larry Poons, painter
- Harvey Quaytman (d. 2002), painter
- Charles Ross, sculptor
- Edward Ruscha, painter, printmaker, photographer, conceptual artist
- Fritz Scholder (d. 2005), painter, printmaker, graphic artist
- Bob Thompson (d. 1966), painter
- William T. Wiley (d. 2021), painter, printmaker
- Marlene Tseng Yu, abstract expressionist
- Richard Van Buren, sculptor
- Larry Zox (d. 2006), painter

=== 1938 ===
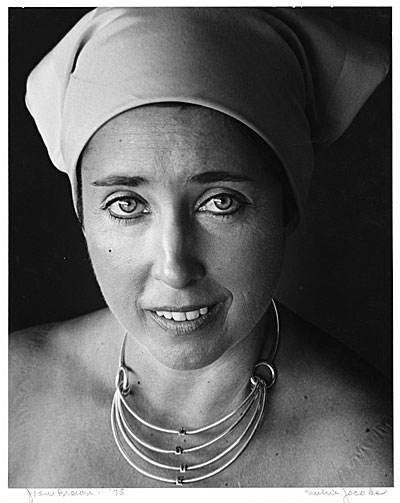
Joan Brown (1938–1990)

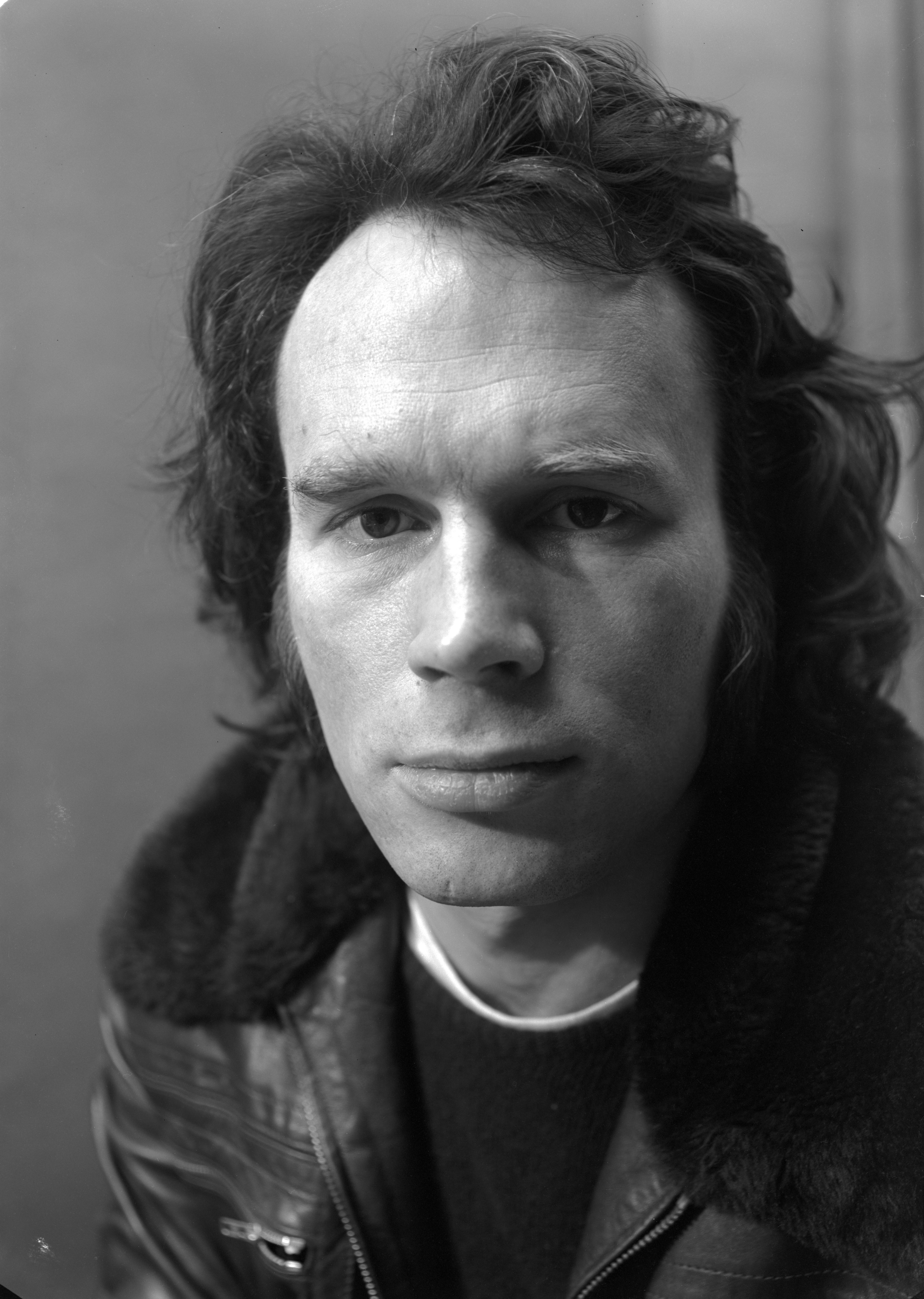
Brice Marden (1938–2023)

- Joan Brown (d. 1990), painter
- Fran Bull, painter, printmaker, sculptor, installation artist
- Vija Celmins, painter, graphic artist, printmaker
- Janet Fish, (d. 2025) painter
- Robert Graham (d. 2008), sculptor
- Dick Higgins (d. 1998), Fluxus artist, composer, writer
- Nancy Holt (d. 2014), sculptor, installation, earth artist
- Robert H. Hudson (d. 2024), sculptor
- Brice Marden (d. 2023), painter, printmaker
- Eugene J. Martin (d. 2005), collagist, painter, graphic artist
- Clark Murray (d. 2022), sculptor, painter
- Stephen Howard Naegle, watercolorist
- Jim Nutt, painter
- Dennis Oppenheim (d. 2011), sculptor, installation, earth artist
- Stephanie Oursler (d. 2018), visual artist, political activist
- Esther Parada (d. 2005), photographer, activist
- Robert Perless (d. 2023), kinetic artist
- Ben Sakoguchi, painter
- Richard Serra (d. 2024), sculptor, printmaker
- Robert Smithson (d. 1973), sculptor, installation, earth artist
- Dieterich Spahn (d. 2021), painter, stained glass designer
- Pat Steir (d. 2026), painter
- Connie Zehr, installation artist

=== 1939 ===
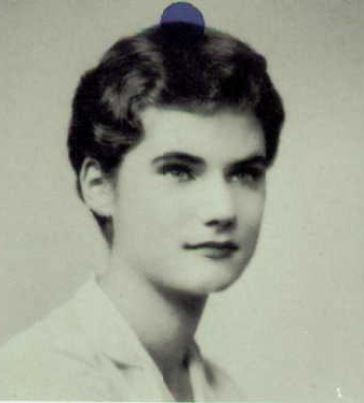
Nancy Graves (1939–1995)

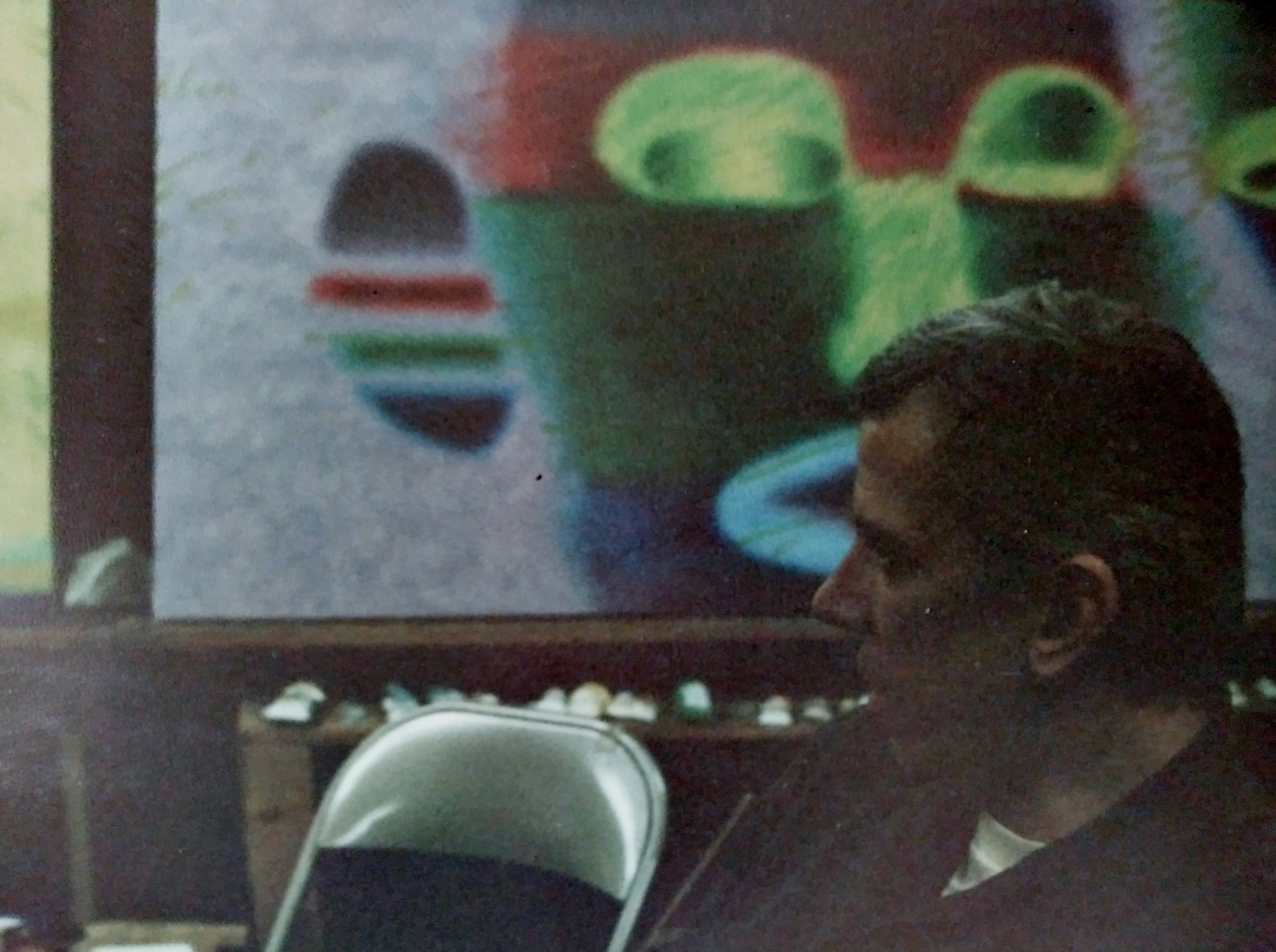
Ed Paschke (1939–2004)

- Peter Alexander (d. 2020), sculptor
- Larry Bell, sculptor
- Jake Berthot (d. 2014), painter
- Scott Burton (d. 1989), sculptor
- Rosemarie Castoro (d. 2015), painter, sculptor
- Judy Chicago, installation artist, sculptor
- William Eggleston, photographer
- Louise Fishman (d. 2021), painter
- Edward J. Fraughton (d. 2024), sculptor, inventor
- Nancy Graves (d. 1995), sculptor, painter, printmaker
- Margia Kramer, interdisciplinary mixed-media artist
- Robert Lostutter, painter
- Ed Paschke (d. 2004), painter, printmaker
- Carolee Schneemann (d. 2019), performance artist
- Paul Shapiro, Abstract Expressionist, landscape painter
- Igor Tulipanov, Russian-born painter
- Mierle Laderman Ukeles, feminist artist, installation artist
- Jack Whitten (d. 2018), painter

== Born 1940–1949 ==
=== 1940 ===
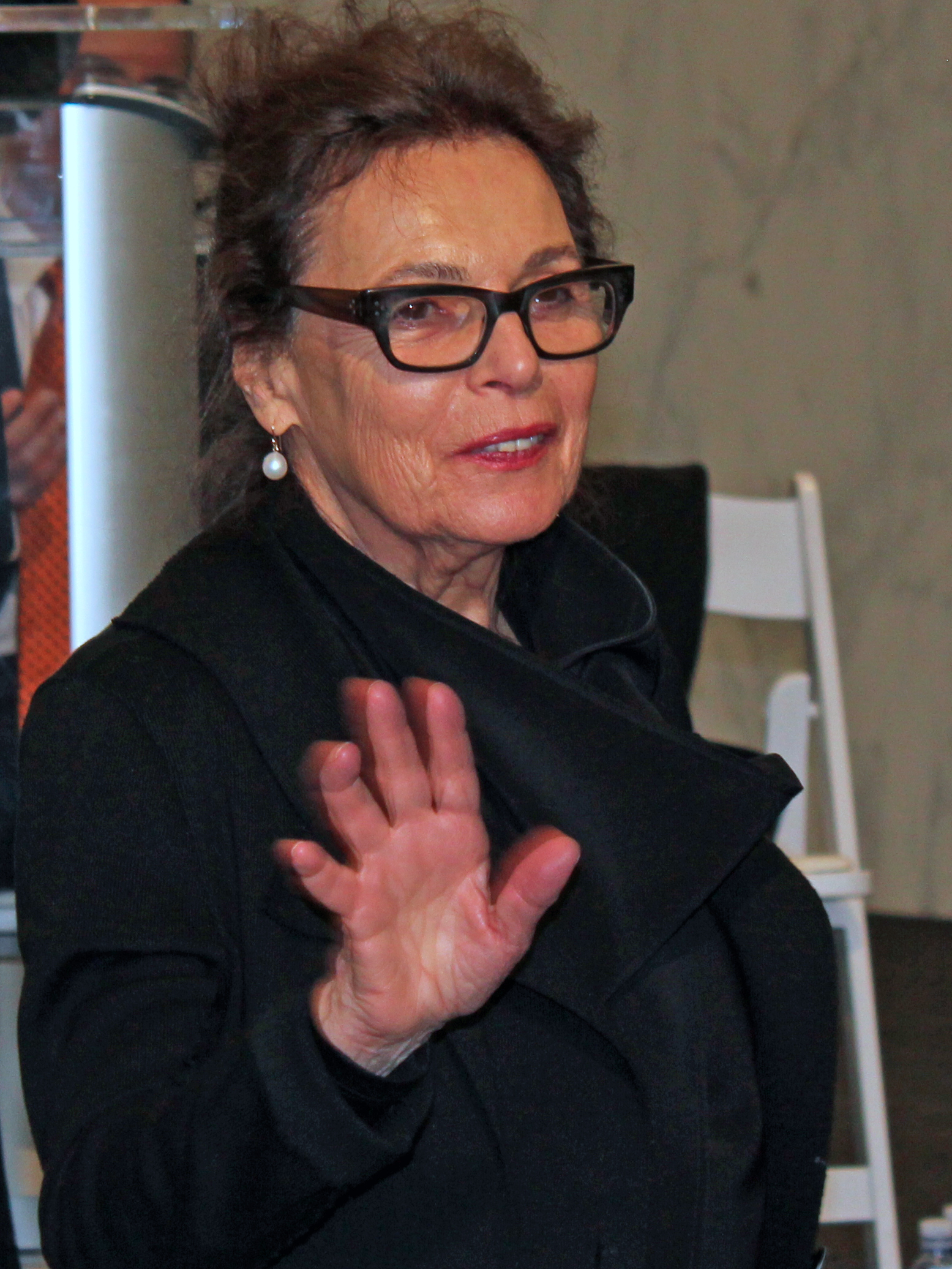
Pat Steir (born 1940)

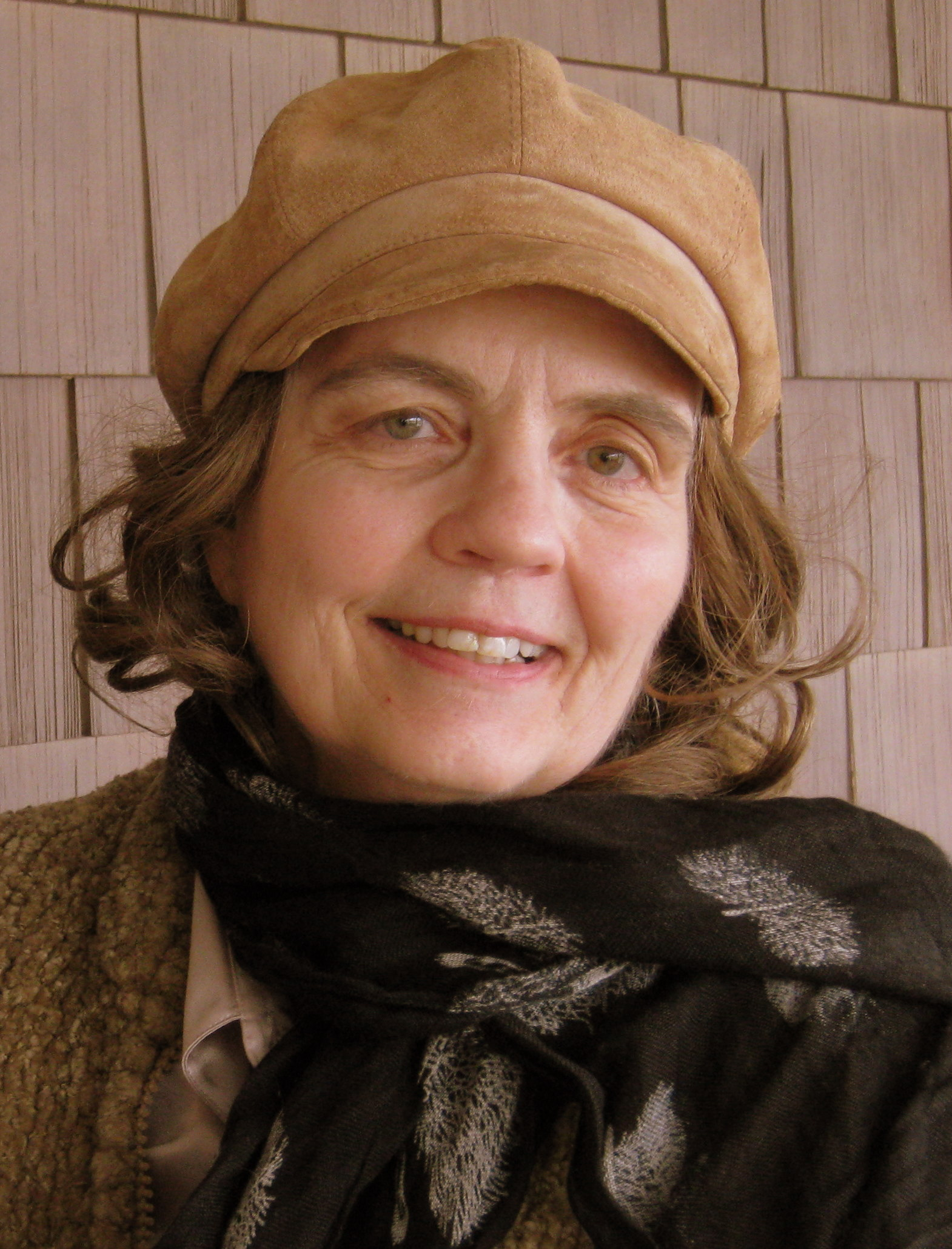
Mym Tuma (born 1940)

- Vito Acconci (d. 2017), conceptual artist, installation artist, performance artist, filmmaker
- Mel Bochner (d. 2025), conceptual artist
- James Bohary, painter
- Gary Bower, painter
- Beverly Buchanan, (d. 2015), painter, sculptor, land artist
- Chuck Close (d. 2021), painter, printmaker
- John Connell (d. 2009), painter, sculptor, printmaker
- Mimi Gross, painter
- Paul Havas (d. 2012), landscape painter
- Mary Heilmann (d. 2026), painter, ceramicist, sculptor
- Harvey Konigsberg, artist
- Jean Milant (d. 2024), printmaker
- Elizabeth Murray (d. 2007), painter, printmaker
- Gladys Nilsson, painter
- Jaune Quick-To-See Smith (d. 2025), painter, printmaker
- Barbara Rossi (d. 2023), painter
- Ernest Ruckle (d. 2018), visual artist
- Steven L. Sles, artist
- Joan Snyder, painter
- Pat Steir, painter
- Mym Tuma, painter, mixed media
- Joyce Wellman, painter, printmaker
- Hannah Wilke (d. 1993), all media
- Peter Young, painter

=== 1941 ===
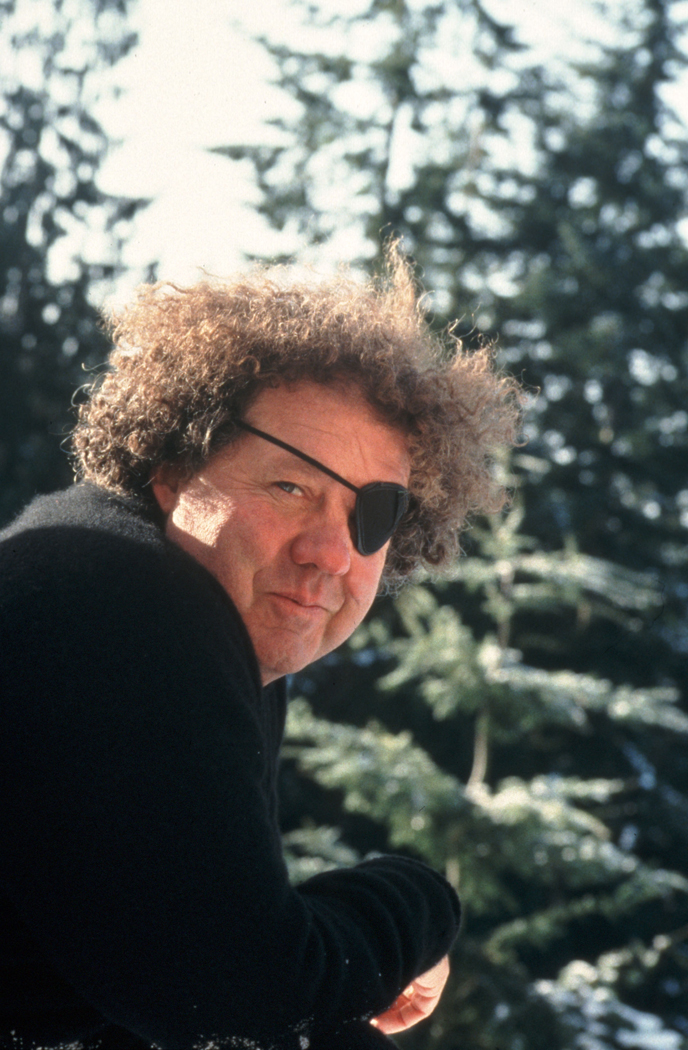
Dale Chihuly (born 1941)

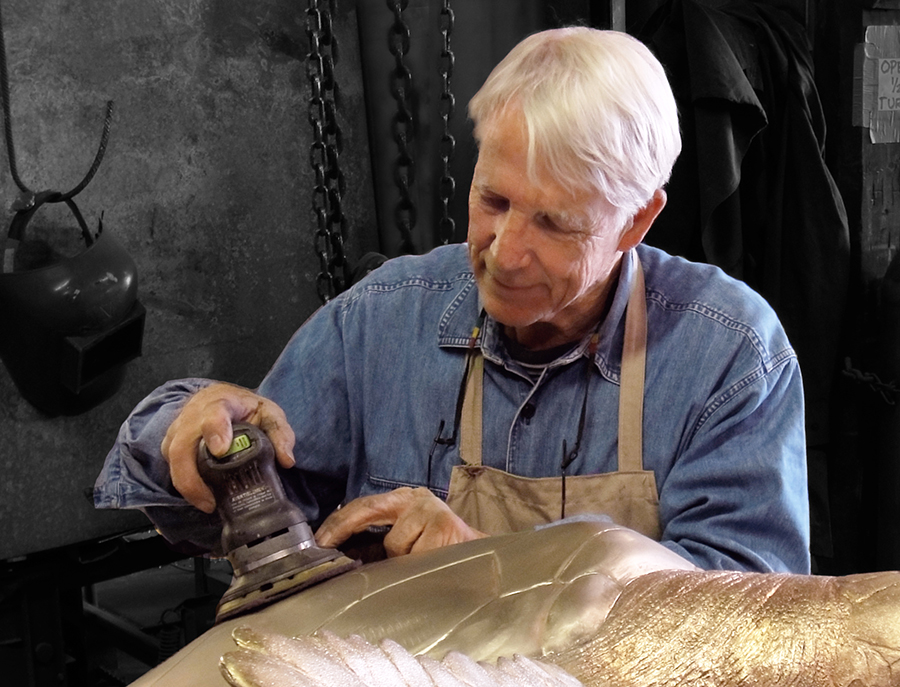
André Harvey (1941–2018)

- Jennifer Bartlett (d. 2022), painter
- Lynda Benglis, sculptor
- Tony Berlant, mixed-media artist
- Karen Breschi, ceramist
- Gary Hugh Brown, painter
- Dale Chihuly, glass sculptor
- John De Andrea, sculptor
- Peter Erskine, light sculptor
- André Harvey (d. 2018), sculptor
- Renne Hughes (d. 1991), painter, photographer
- Mary Kelly, conceptual artist
- William Leavitt, conceptual artist, painter, installation artist
- Pat Lipsky, painter
- Judith Lodge, painter, photographer
- Forrest Myers, sculptor
- Bruce Nauman, installation artist, video artist, printmaker
- Martin Puryear, sculptor, printmaker
- Anita Rodriguez, artist incorporating ingenious ceremonialism, mysticism
- John Seery, painter
- Joel Shapiro (d. 2025), sculptor
- Keith Sonnier (d. 2020), sculptor
- Richard Tuttle, sculptor, painter, installation artist
- Jackie Winsor (d. 2024), sculptor
- Joe Zucker (d. 2024), mixed-media artist

=== 1942 ===
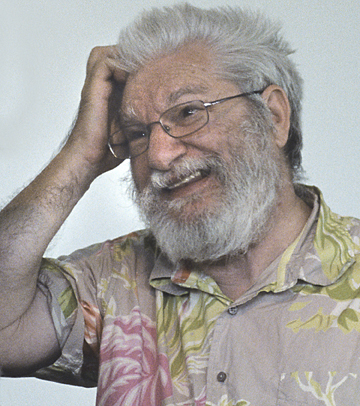
Dan Graham (1942–2022)

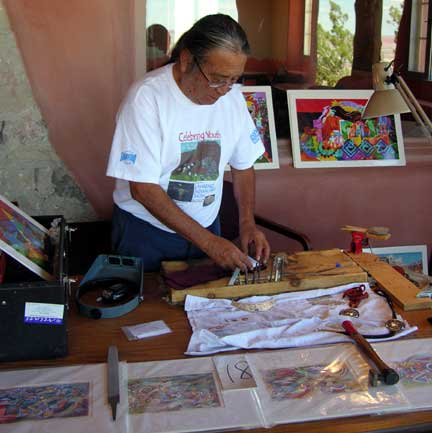
Michael Kabotie (1942–2022)

- Judith Bernstein, feminist artist
- Jonathan Borofsky, painter, sculptor, installation artist
- Jerry Dolyn Brown (d. 2016), folk artist, potter
- Rhea Carmi, abstract expressionist, mixed-media artist
- Dan Christensen (d. 2007), painter
- Susan Crile, painter
- Porfirio DiDonna (d. 1986), painter
- Lucien Dulfan, Soviet-born conceptual artist
- Dan Graham (d. 2022), conceptual artist, performance artist
- Jann Haworth, sculptor
- Michael Kabotie (d. 2009), painter, silversmith
- Harry McCormick (d. 2023), interior spaces painter
- Bob Ross (d. 1995), painter, television artist
- David True, painter
- Lawrence Weiner (d. 2021), conceptual artist
- William T. Williams, painter

=== 1943 ===
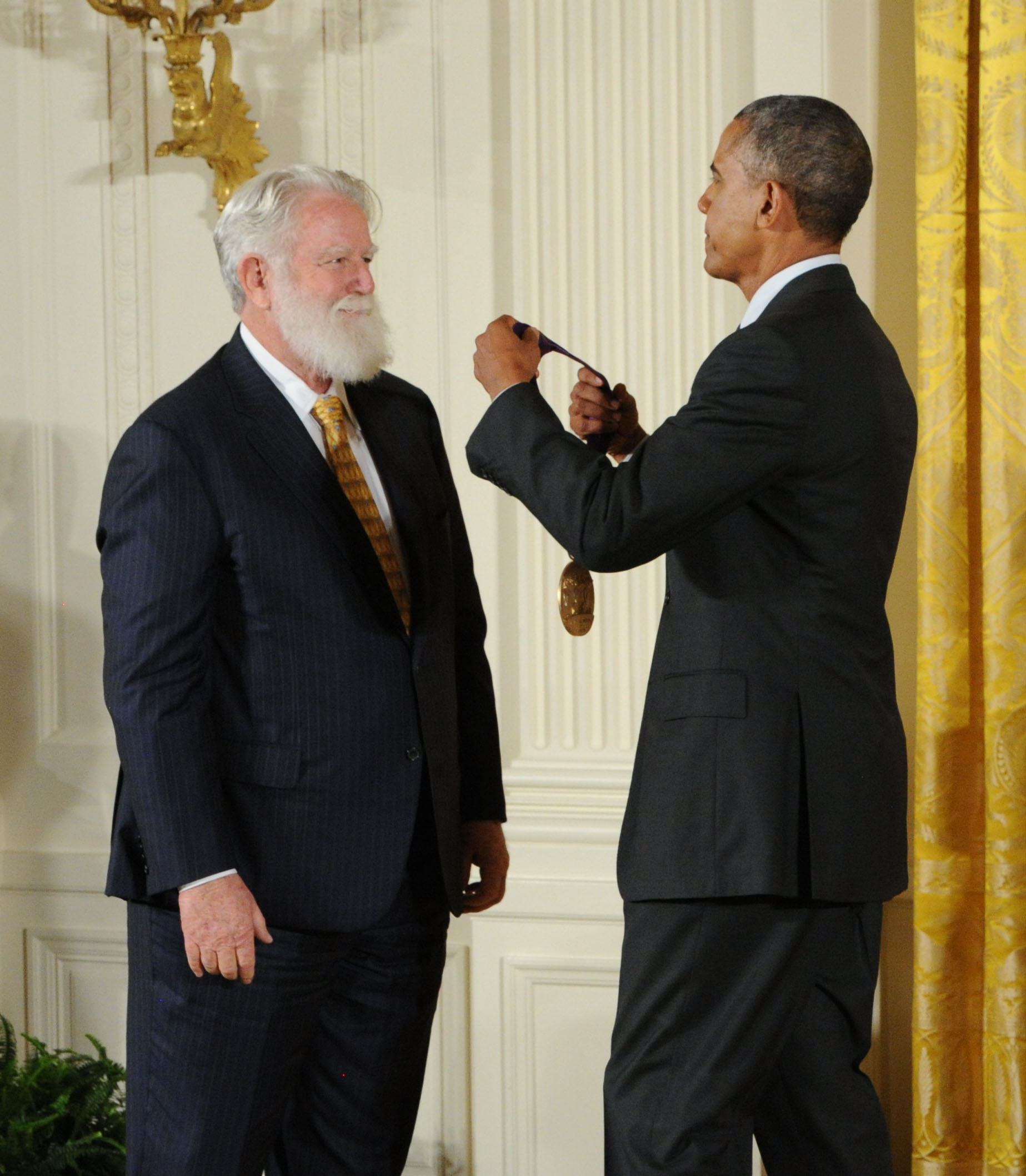
Paul Laffoley (born 1943)

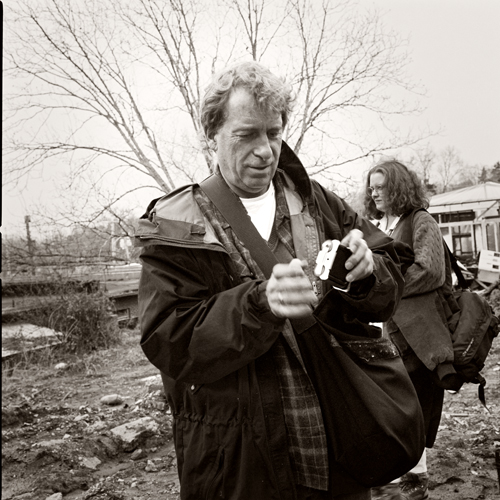
William Wegman (born 1943)

- Michael Asher (d. 2012), conceptual and installation artist
- Sandra Bowden, painter
- Robert Butler (d. 2014), painter, visual artist
- Pauline Campanelli (d. 2001), painter, writer
- Cora Cohen (d. 2023), painter
- Ron Cooper, artist
- Robert Crumb, cartoonist
- David Diao, painter
- William Dutterer (d. 2007), painter
- Simon Gaon, painter
- David Hammons, installation artist, sculptor
- Helen Hardin (d. 1984), painter
- Steven Kemenyffy, ceramist
- Stephen Kline, painter, photographer, pen, ink
- Gordon Matta-Clark (d. 1978), situationist, site-specific artist, performance artist
- Howardena Pindell, painter, mixed media artist
- David R. Prentice (d. 2024), painter
- Martha Rosler, video, photo-text, installation, performance art
- Suze Rotolo (d. 2011), book artist
- Susan Louise Shatter (d. 2011), landscape painter
- Betty Spindler, ceramist
- James Surls, sculptor, visual artist
- James Turrell, installation artist
- William Wegman, video artist, photographer, painter
- Jerry Wilkerson (d. 2007), painter
- Christopher Wilmarth (d. 1987), sculptor

=== 1944 ===
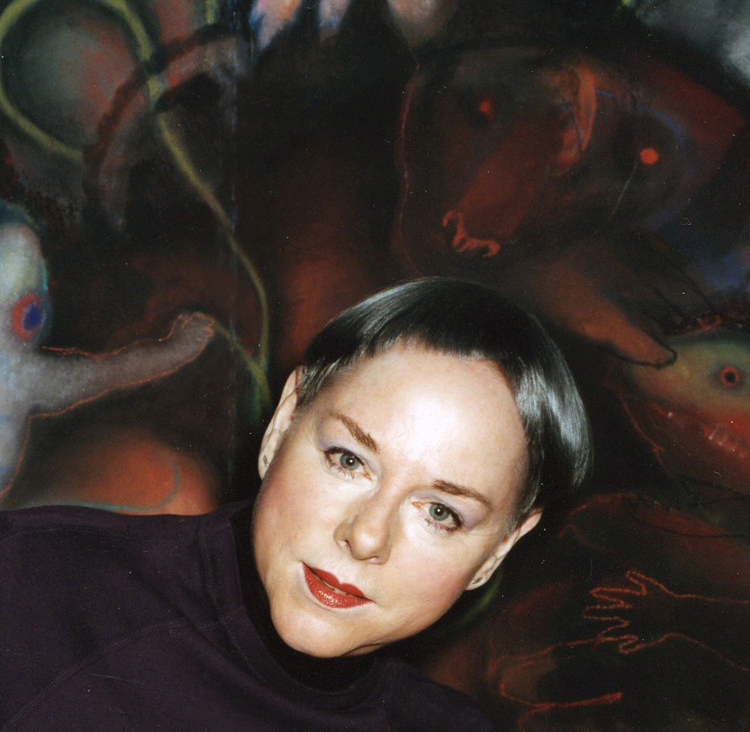
Jan Harrison (born 1944)

- Lewis Bryden, naturalistic landscapes
- Louis Delsarte (d. 2020), painter
- Don Eddy, painter
- Jan Harrison, painter, sculptor
- Michael Heizer, sculptor, earth artist
- Sanit Khewhok, painter, sculptor
- Allan McCollum, conceptual artist, sculptor, all media
- Richard Mock (d. 2006), painter
- Thomas Nozkowski(d. 2019), painter
- Susan Mohl Powers (d. 2023), sculptor, painter
- Fred H. Roster (d. 2017), sculptor
- Allen Ruppersberg, conceptual artist, installation artist
- Alan Saret, (d. 2026), sculptor

=== 1945 ===
Donray (born 1945)

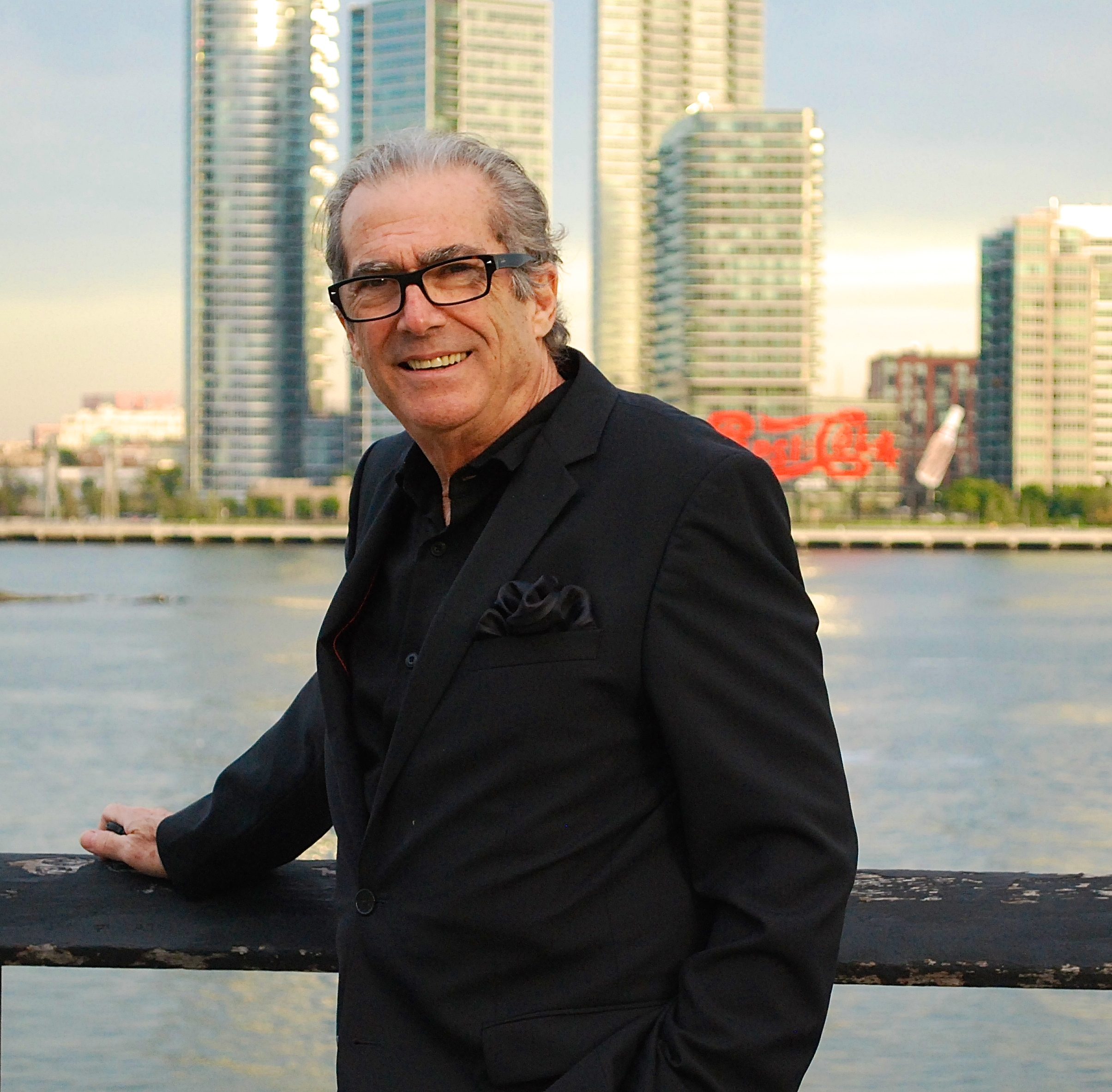
Peter Reginato (born 1945)

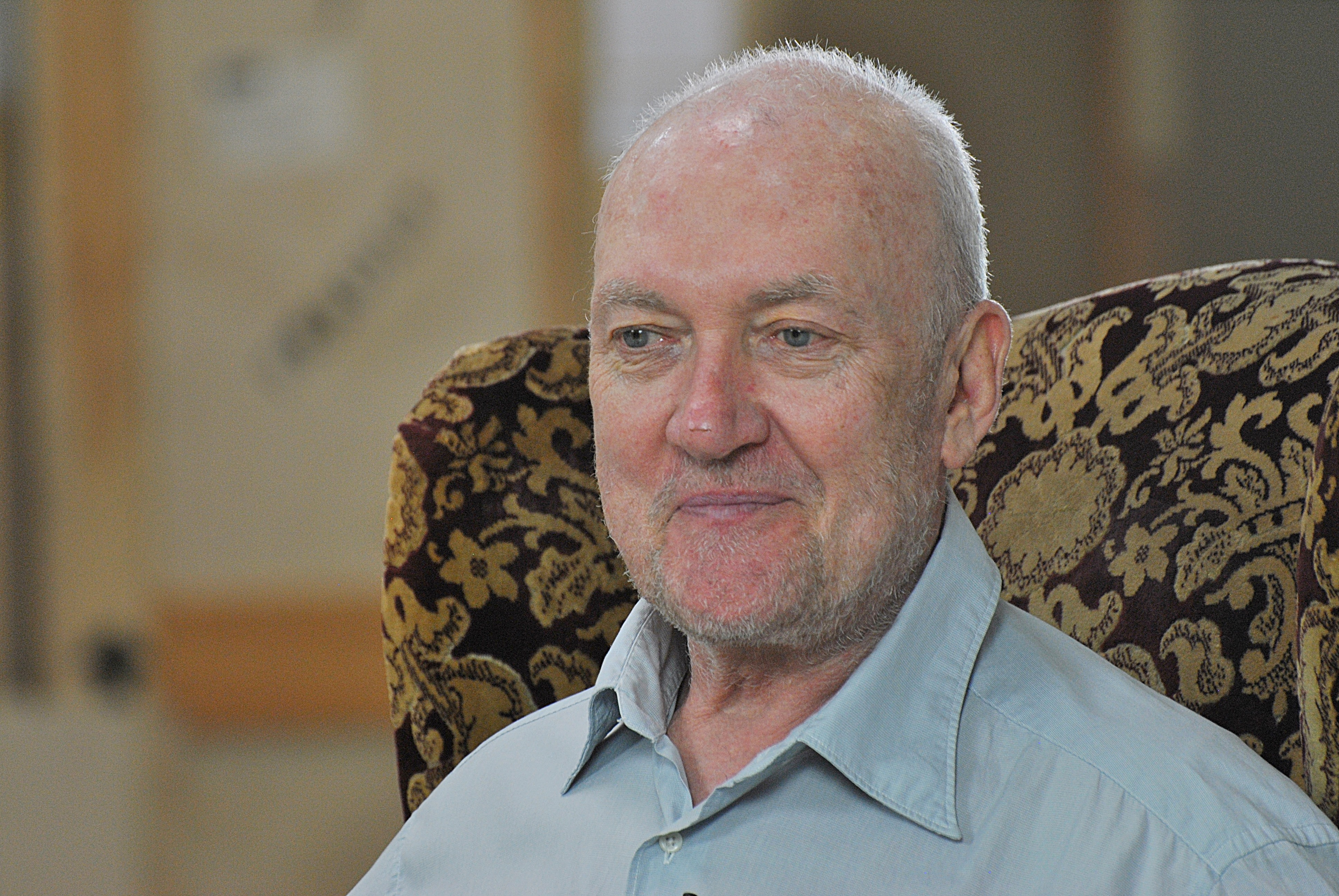
Sean Scully (born 1945)

- Louis Briel (d. 2021), portrait artist
- Michele Oka Doner, sculptor, public artist, printmaker, video artist
- Donray, painter
- Sheila Elias, painter, art historian
- Carole Feuerman, sculptor
- Charles Fincher, cartoonist
- Helen C. Frederick, printmaker
- Fernando Garcia (d. 1989), conceptual artist
- Jack Goldstein (d. 2003), conceptual artist, filmmaker, painter
- Glenda Green, painter
- Benjamin Harjo Jr. (d. 2023), painter, printmaker
- Neil Jenney, painter
- Charles Hollis Jones, furniture designer
- Joseph Kosuth, conceptual artist
- Barbara Kruger, photographer, graphic artist, sculptor
- Suzanne Lacy, installations, video, performance artist
- Robert Lawrance Lobe, sculptor
- Paul McCarthy, sculptor, installation artist, video artist
- Robert W. Olszewski, painter, miniatures artist
- Louise Parks, painter
- Astrid Preston, painter
- Peter Reginato, sculptor
- Judy Rifka, painter, video artist
- Susan Rothenberg (d. 2020), painter, printmaker
- Sean Scully, Irish-born painter, printmaker
- Carol Sutton (d. 2025), painter
- Audrey Ushenko, realist figurative painter
- Daisy Youngblood, ceramist, sculptor

=== 1946 ===
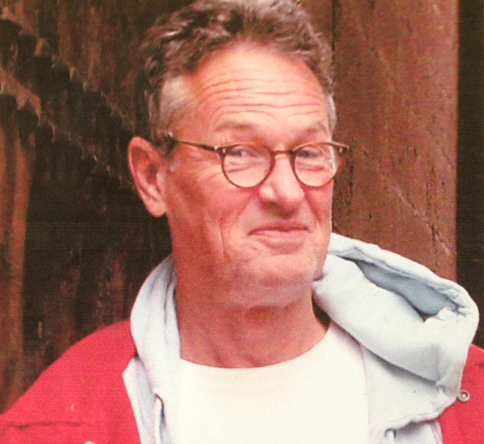
Dennis Ashbaugh (born 1946)

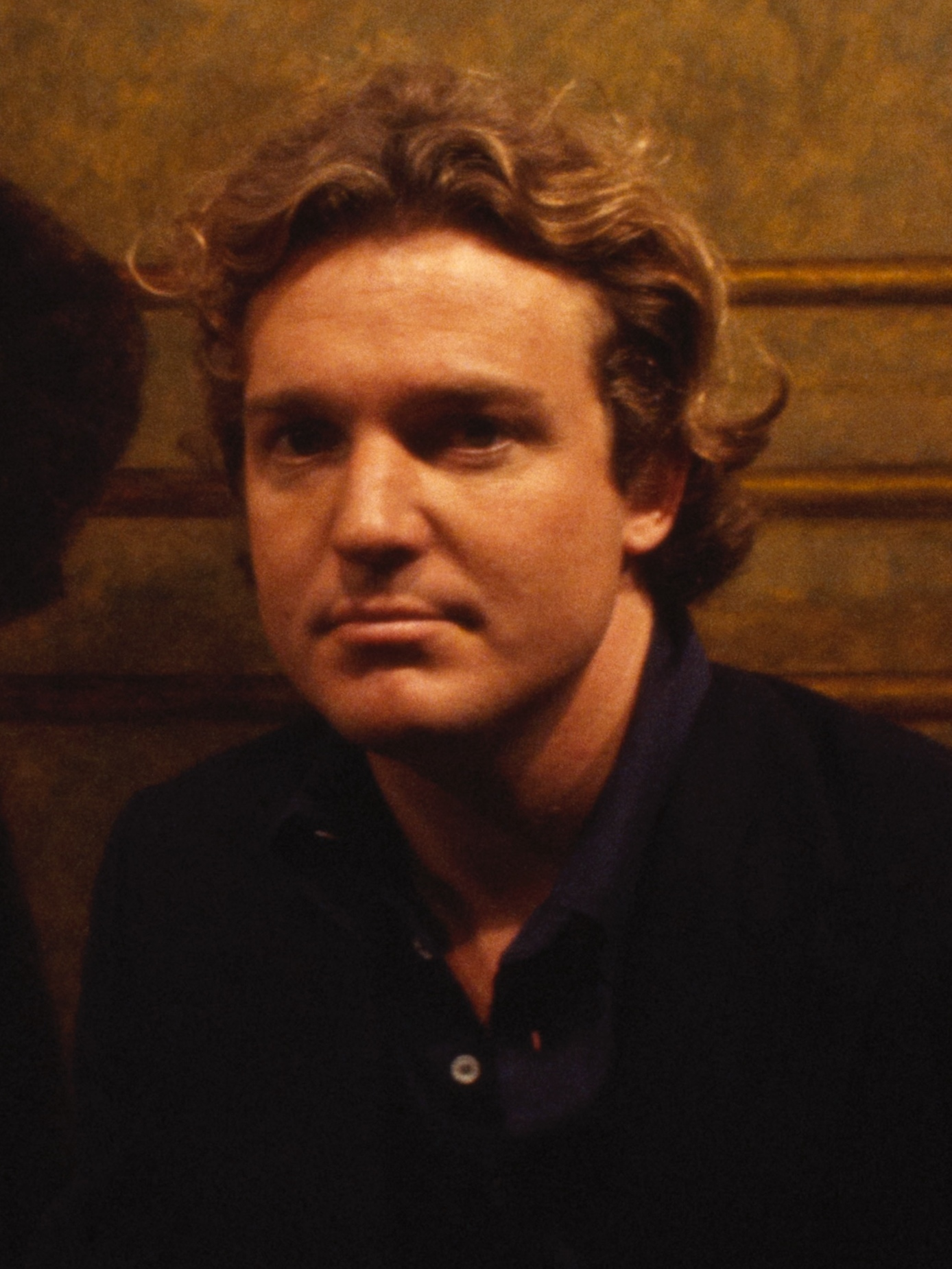
Jamie Wyeth (born 1946)

- Charles Arnoldi, painter
- Dennis Ashbaugh, painter
- Alice Aycock, sculptor
- Frances Bagley, sculptor
- Jean Bales (d. 2003), painter, printmaker
- Betty Beaumont, site-specific artist, all media
- EC Bell, painter
- Chris Burden (d. 2015), performance artist, sculptor
- T. C. Cannon (d. 1978), painter
- David Dewey, watercolor landscapes
- Dennis H. Farber (d. 2017), painter, photographer
- Don Gummer, sculptor
- David Eugene Henry, painter, sculptor
- Nabil Kanso (d. 2019), painter
- Lev Kublanov, Russian-born graphic artist
- Fran Lew, painter
- Robert Mapplethorpe (d. 1989), photographer
- Anthony McCall, British-born installation artist, projected film
- Ann McCoy, sculpture, drawing
- Anne Neely, painter
- Lonnie Ortega, aviation artist
- David Reed, painter
- Ann Leda Shapiro, painter.
- Marsha Steinberg, drawing, etchings, paintings
- Jamie Wyeth, painter
- Bhakti Ziek, textiles

=== 1947 ===
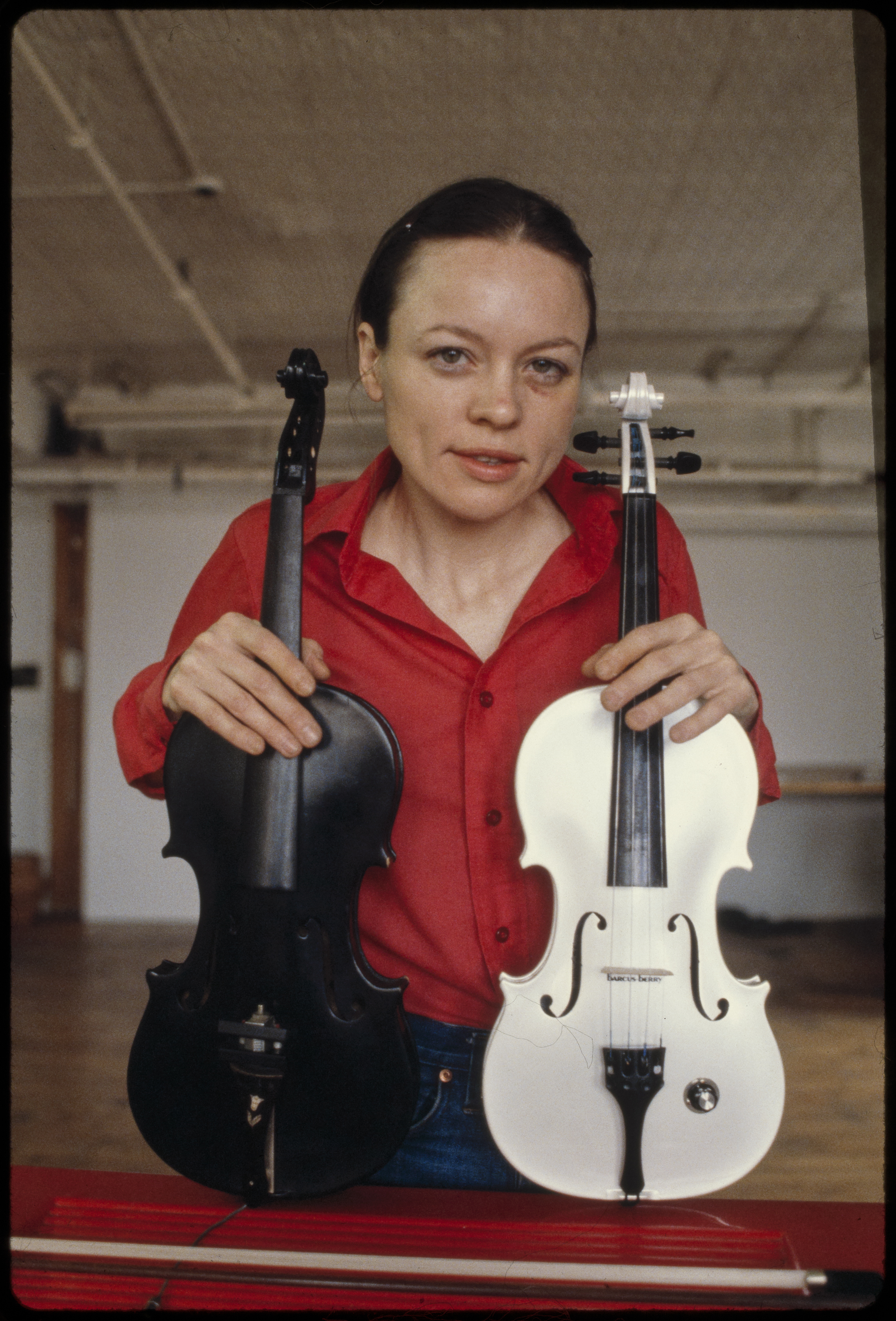
Laurie Anderson (born 1947)

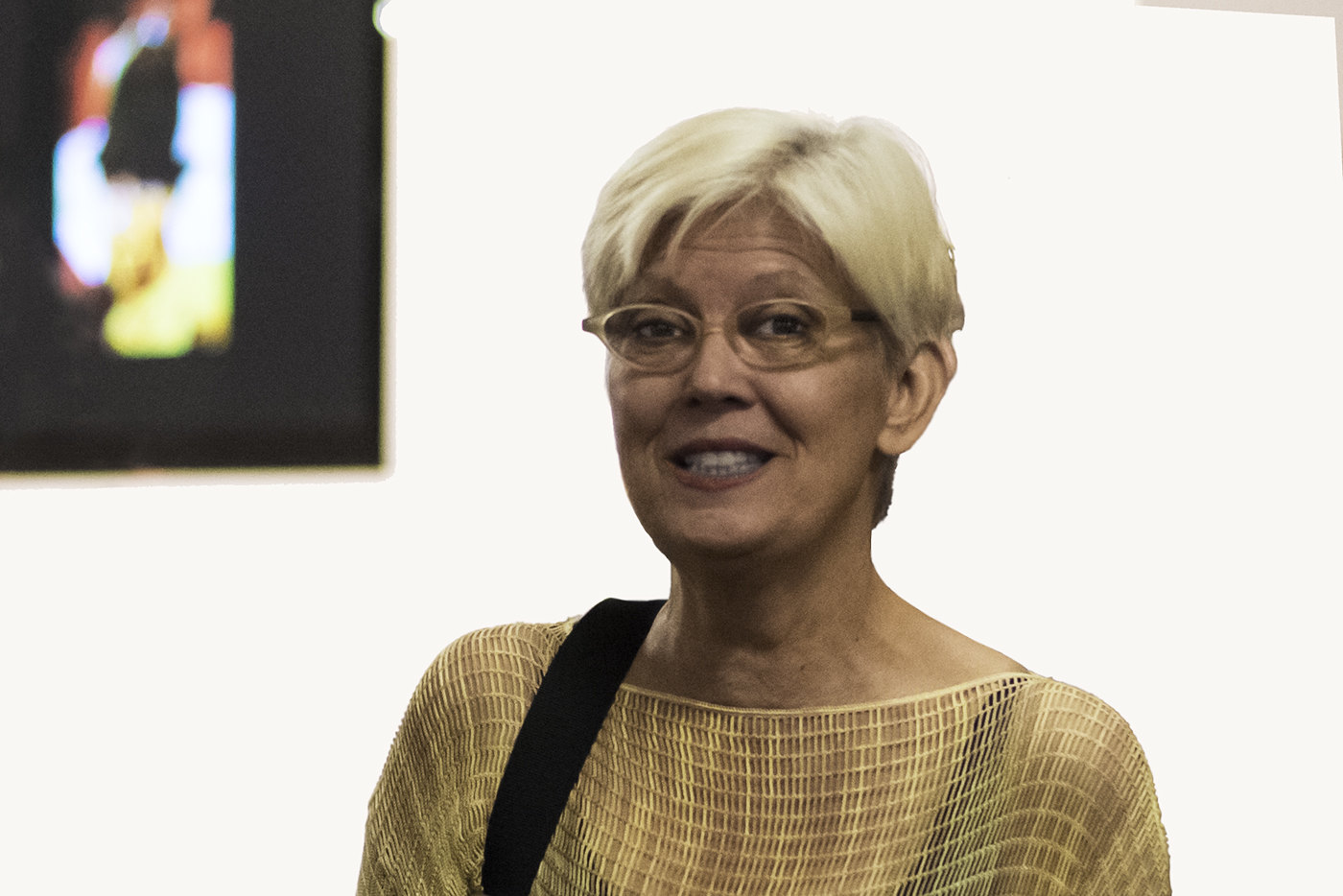
Louise Lawler (born 1947)

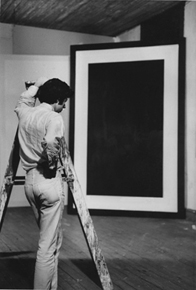
Ronnie Landfield (born 1947)

- Laurie Anderson, experimental performance artist, musician
- Allen 'Big Al' Carter (d. 2008), painter, printmaker, photographer, sculptor
- Sarah Charlesworth (d. 2013), conceptual artist, photographer
- Daniel Kelly, painter, printmaker
- Ronnie Landfield, painter
- Louise Lawler, photographer, conceptual and installation artist
- Sherrie Levine, conceptual artist
- Anado McLauchlin (d. 2021), artist
- Richard Minsky, bookbinder, cover artist
- Stephen Mueller (d. 2011), painter
- Eduardo Oropeza (d. 2003)
- Linda Ridgway, sculptor
- Christine Rosamond (d. 1994), painter
- James Schoppert (d. 1992), Alaskan Native artist
- Larry Stanton (d. 1984), painter

=== 1948 ===
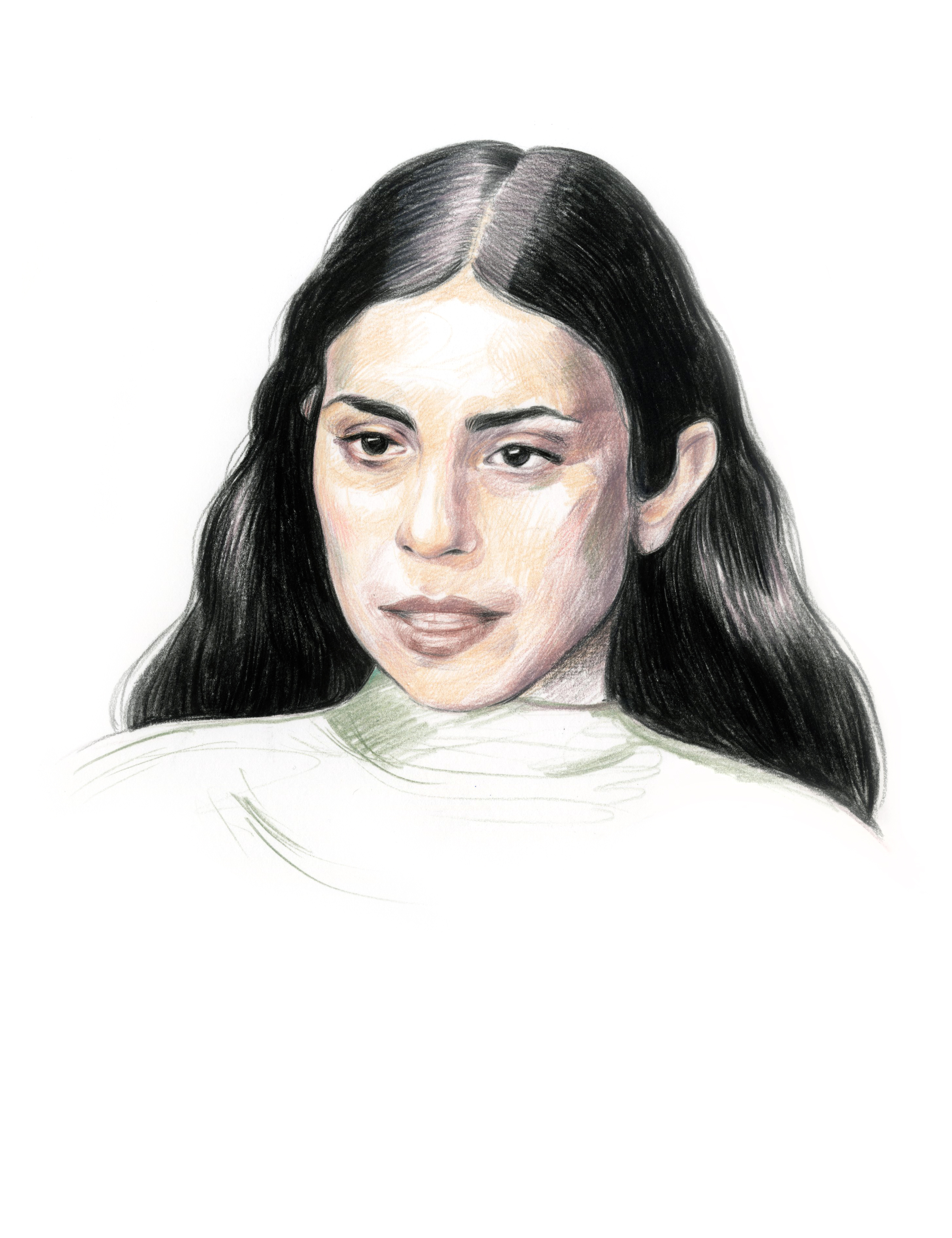
Ana Mendieta (1948–1985)

- Cornelia Breitenbach (d. 1984), textile artist
- Ronnie Cutrone (d. 2013), painter
- Eric Fischl, painter, printmaker
- David Geiser (d. 2020), painter
- Michael Hofmann, sumi-e painter
- Rhodessa Jones, artistic director, writer
- Thomas Lanigan-Schmidt, installation, collage
- Jonathan Lasker, painter
- Ana Mendieta (d. 1985), performance artist
- Meridel Rubenstein, photographer, installation artist
- Joseph Sanchez, painter, museum curator
- Judith Shea, sculptor
- Hollis Sigler (d. 2001), painter, printmaker
- Lizbeth Stewart (d. 2013), ceramist
- Altoon Sultan, painter
- J. Craig Thorpe, landscape artist
- J. Chris Wilson (d. 2023), artist
- Brian Wood, film maker, multiple media, painter, photographer

=== 1949 ===
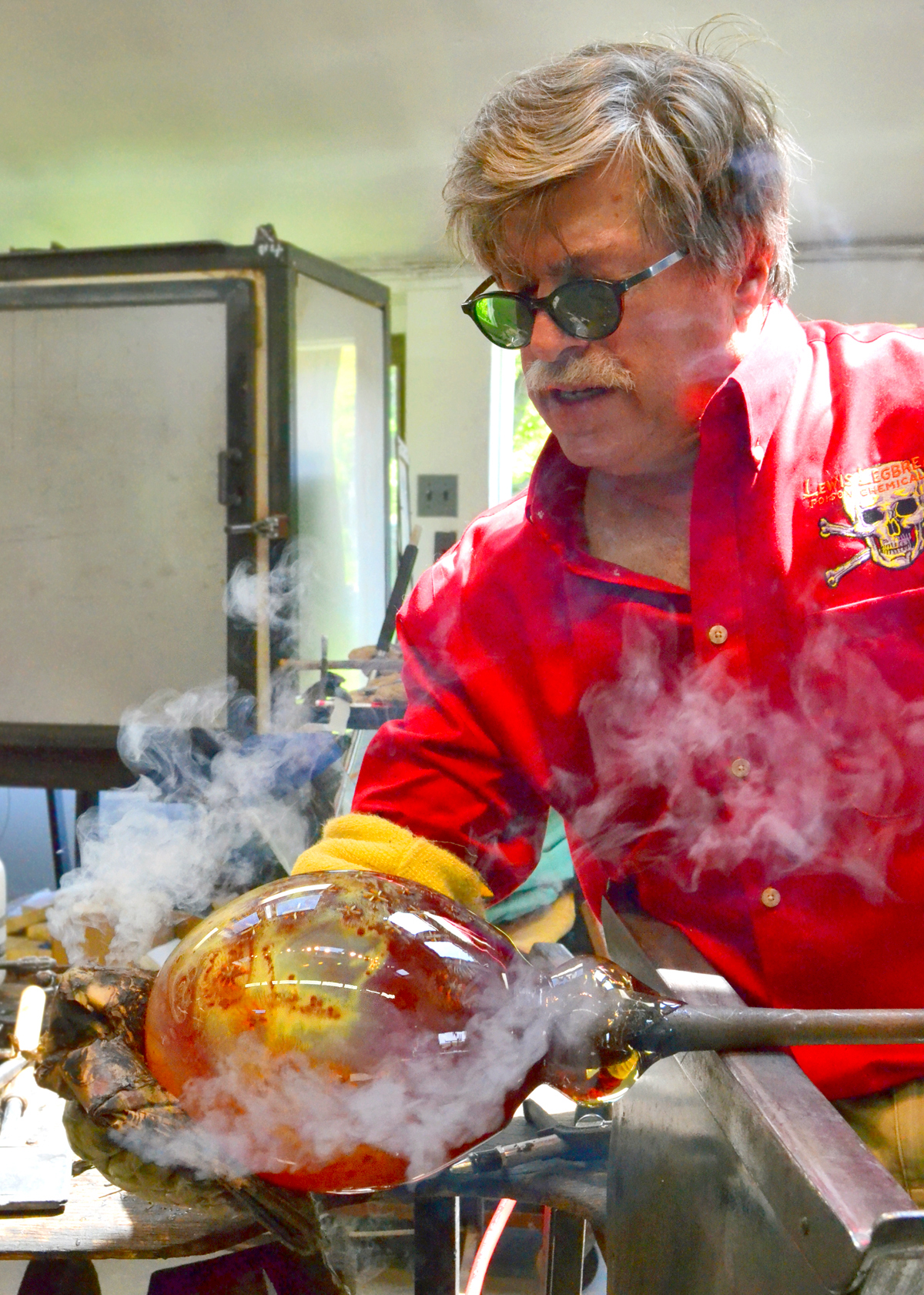
Josh Simpson (born 1949)

- Ross Bleckner, painter
- Deborah Butterfield, sculptor
- Stephen Hickman (d. 2021), illustrator, sculptor
- Geoffrey Laurence, painter
- Richard Prince, painter, photographer, sculptor
- Archie Rand, painter, muralist
- Barbara Schwartz (d. 2006), painter, sculptor
- Laurie Simmons, photographer
- Josh Simpson, glass artist
- Mark Tansey, painter
- Bruce Wands (d. 2022), digital artist
- Andrea Way, painter, sculptor
- Jean Wells, mosaic sculptor

== Born 1950–1959 ==
=== 1950 ===
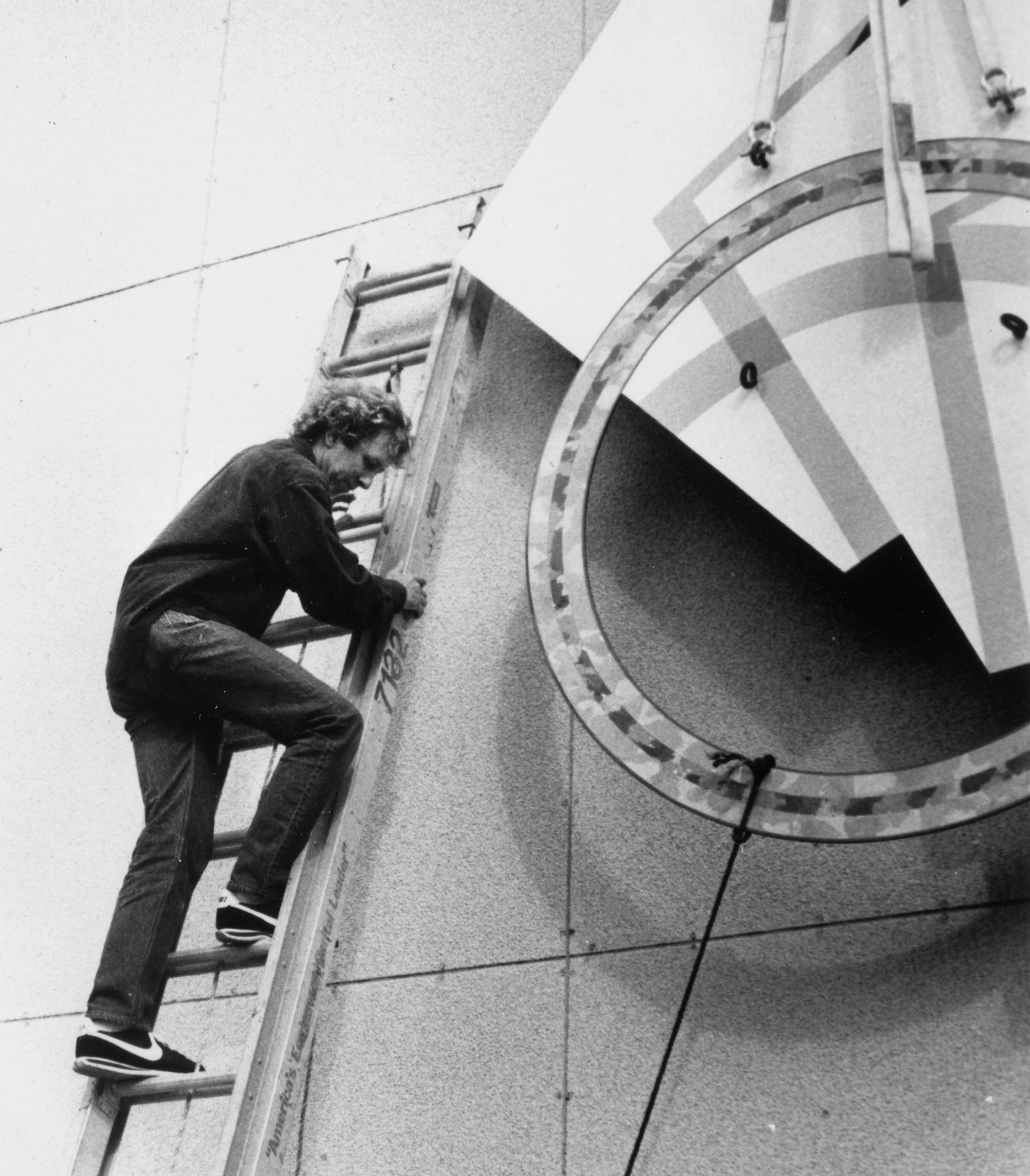
Jack Reilly (born 1950)

- Lesley Dill, sculptor, printmaker, photographer, painter, performance artist
- Lin Evola, painter
- Margery E. Goldberg, painter, sculptor
- Jenny Holzer, conceptual artist
- Marilyn Kirsch, painter
- Jack Reilly, painter
- James Rizzi (d. 2011), painter
- Mary Michael Shelley, carver, painter
- Ira Sherman, sculptor
- Glennray Tutor, painter
- Pheoris West (d. 2021), artist

=== 1951 ===
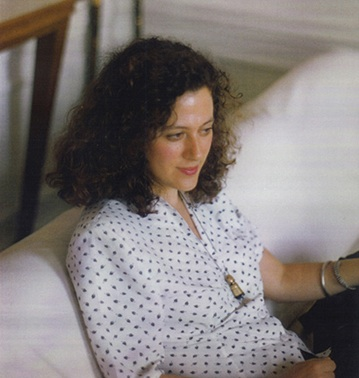
Lisa Bradley (born 1951)

Lee H. Letts (born 1951)

- Ned Bittinger, painter
- Douglas Bourgeois, sculptor, figurative painter
- Lisa Bradley, painter
- Louisa Chase (d. 2016), painter
- Mary Heebner, painter
- Gary Hill, video installation artist
- Lee H. Letts, bronze sculptor, goldsmith, painter
- Melissa Miller, painter
- Matt Mullican, video, painting, electronic media, installation
- Joseph Nechvatal, digital painter
- Nic Nicosia, art photographer
- James Dean Pruner (d. 1987/1988), painter, printmaker, sculptor
- Julian Schnabel, painter, filmmaker
- Peter Shelton, sculptor
- Michael Smith, performance, video, installation artist
- Lynne Woods Turner, abstract painter
- Bill Viola (d. 2024), video artist
- Russ Warren, figurative painter
- William Wolk (d. 2022), realist painter

=== 1952 ===
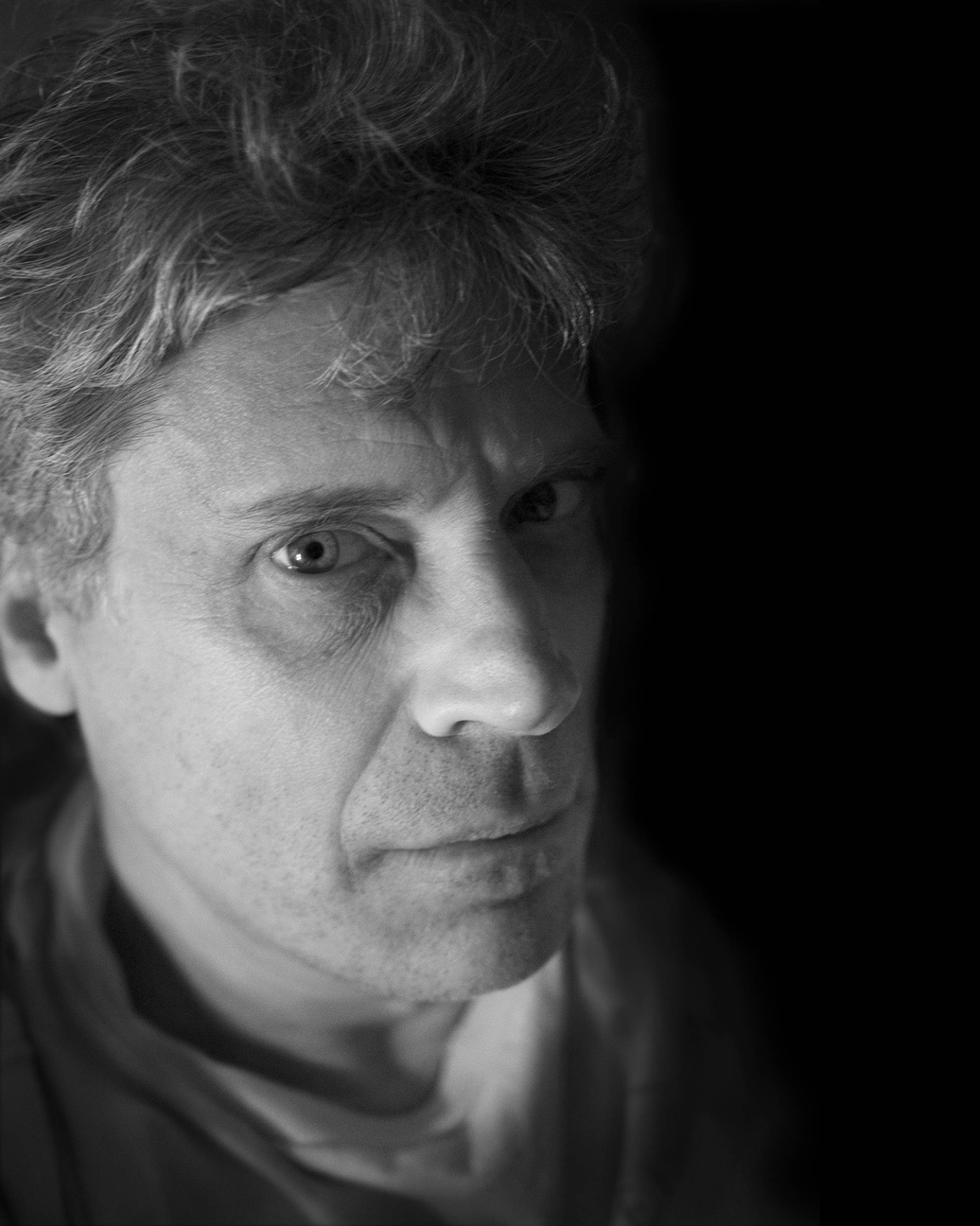
David Em (born 1952)

- Chris Campbell, painter
- David Em, digital artist
- Sonya Fe, painter
- Ken Feingold, installation artist, all media
- Sam Havadtoy, painter, interior designer
- Nicholas Hondrogen (d. 2007), painter
- Deborah Kass, painter
- Cynthia Knott, seascapes
- Deborah Nehmad, printmaker, mixed-media artist
- John Newman, sculptor
- Tom Otterness, sculptor
- Lari Pittman, painter
- John Pomara, abstract artist
- Clifford Ross, painter, photographer, video
- David Salle, painter
- Linda St. Clair (d. 2018), wildlife painter

=== 1953 ===
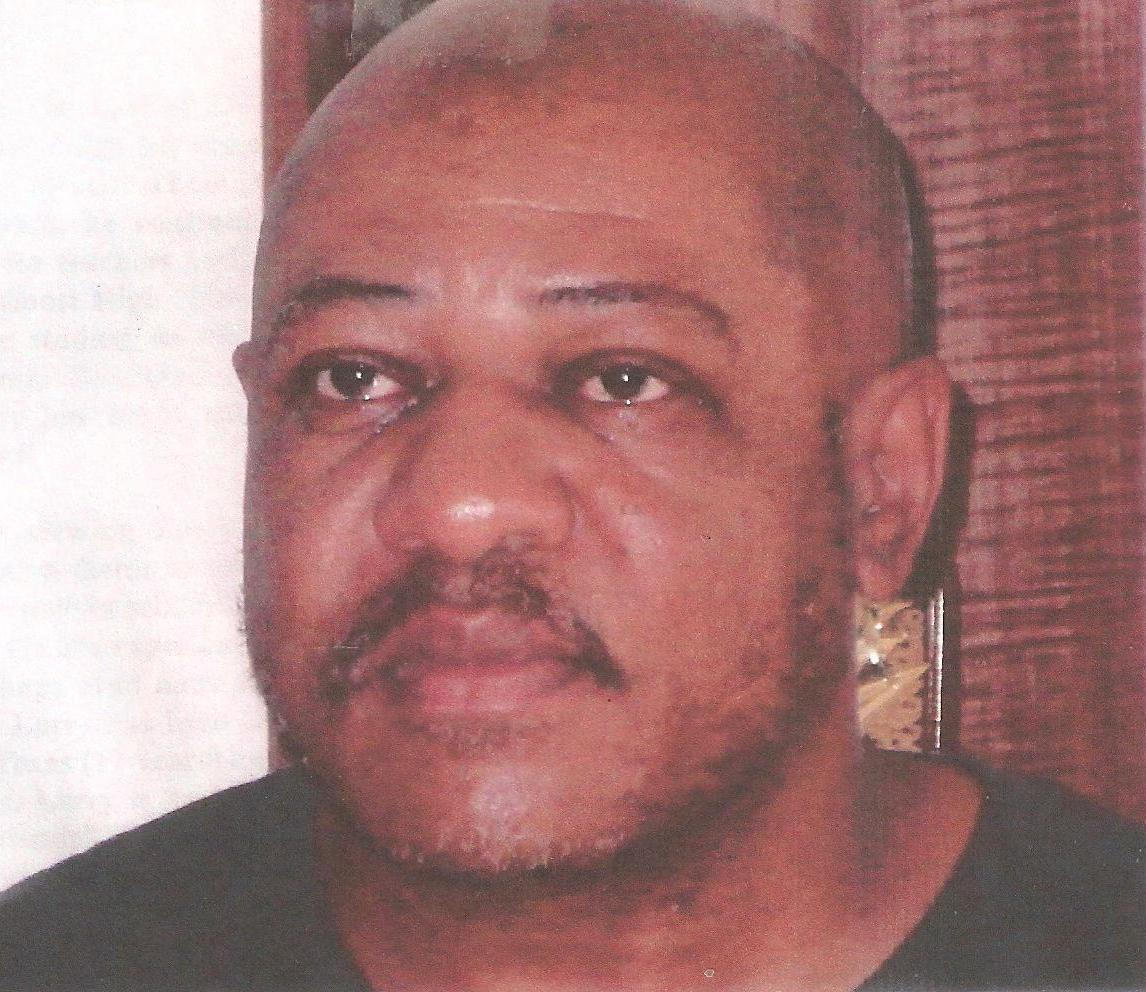
Larry D. Alexander (born 1953)

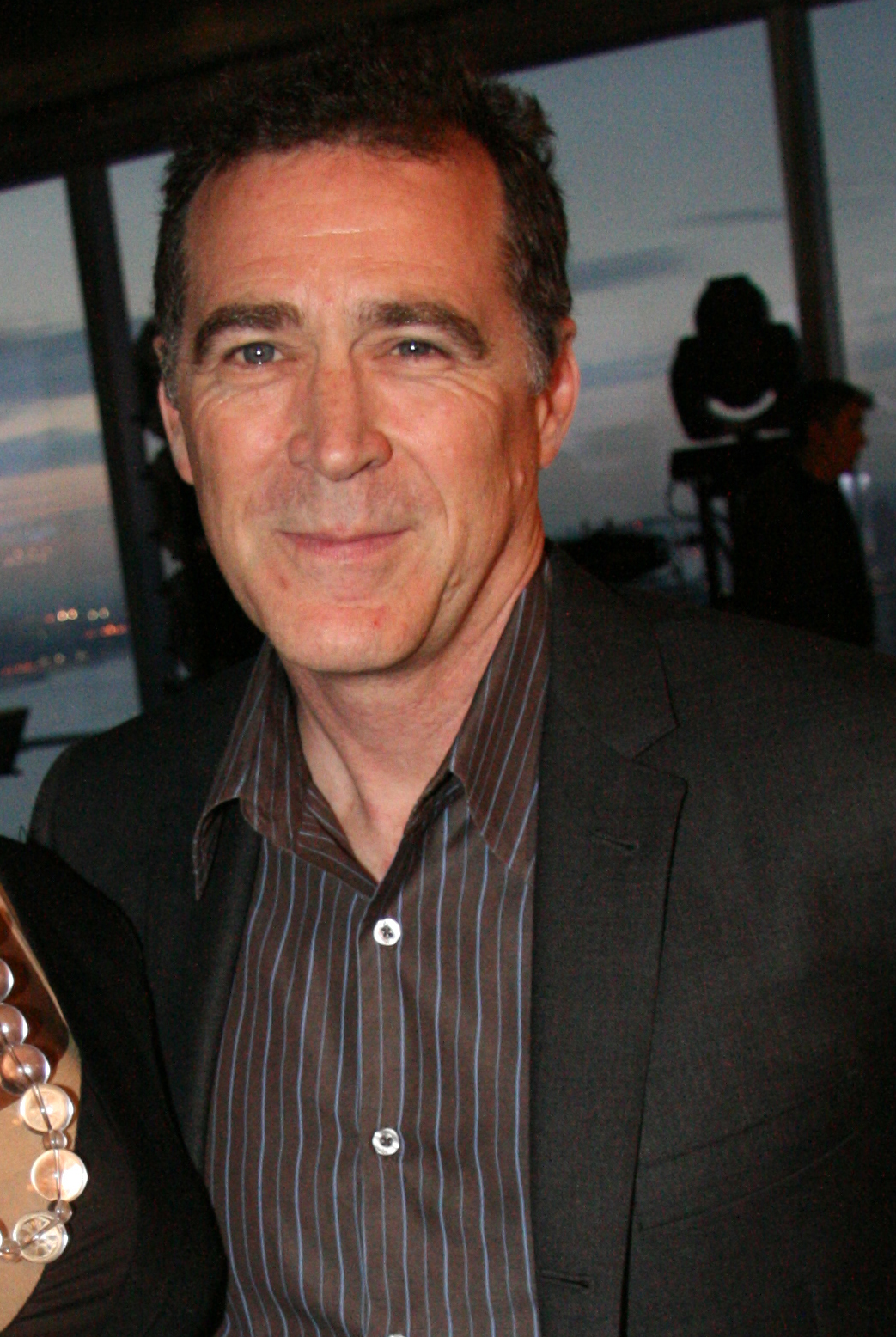
James Casebere (born 1953)

- Larry D. Alexander, painter
- Debra Bermingham, interior scenes, still lifes
- Rebecca Bluestone, tapestry weaver
- Sean K. L. Browne, sculptor
- James Casebere, photographer
- Gordon Chandler, sculptor
- Jeff Chapman-Crane, painter
- Philip-Lorca diCorcia, photographer
- Sean Earley (d. 1992), oil painter, commercial illustrator
- Glenn Goldberg, painter
- April Gornik, painter
- Alex Grey, artist
- Michael Hafftka, painter
- Peter Halley, painter
- Malcolm T. Liepke, painter
- Robert Longo, sculptor, graphic artist
- Sergio Rossetti Morosini, painter, sculptor
- Stephen Namara, figurative artist
- Tom Nussbaum, painter, sculptor, graphic artist
- Charles Ray, sculptor
- Geoffrey Raymond, painter, executive portraits
- Alexander Tsiaras, artist, photojournalist
- Carol Wax, printmaker
- Carrie Mae Weems, photographer
- Stephen Westfall, painter, art critic

=== 1954 ===
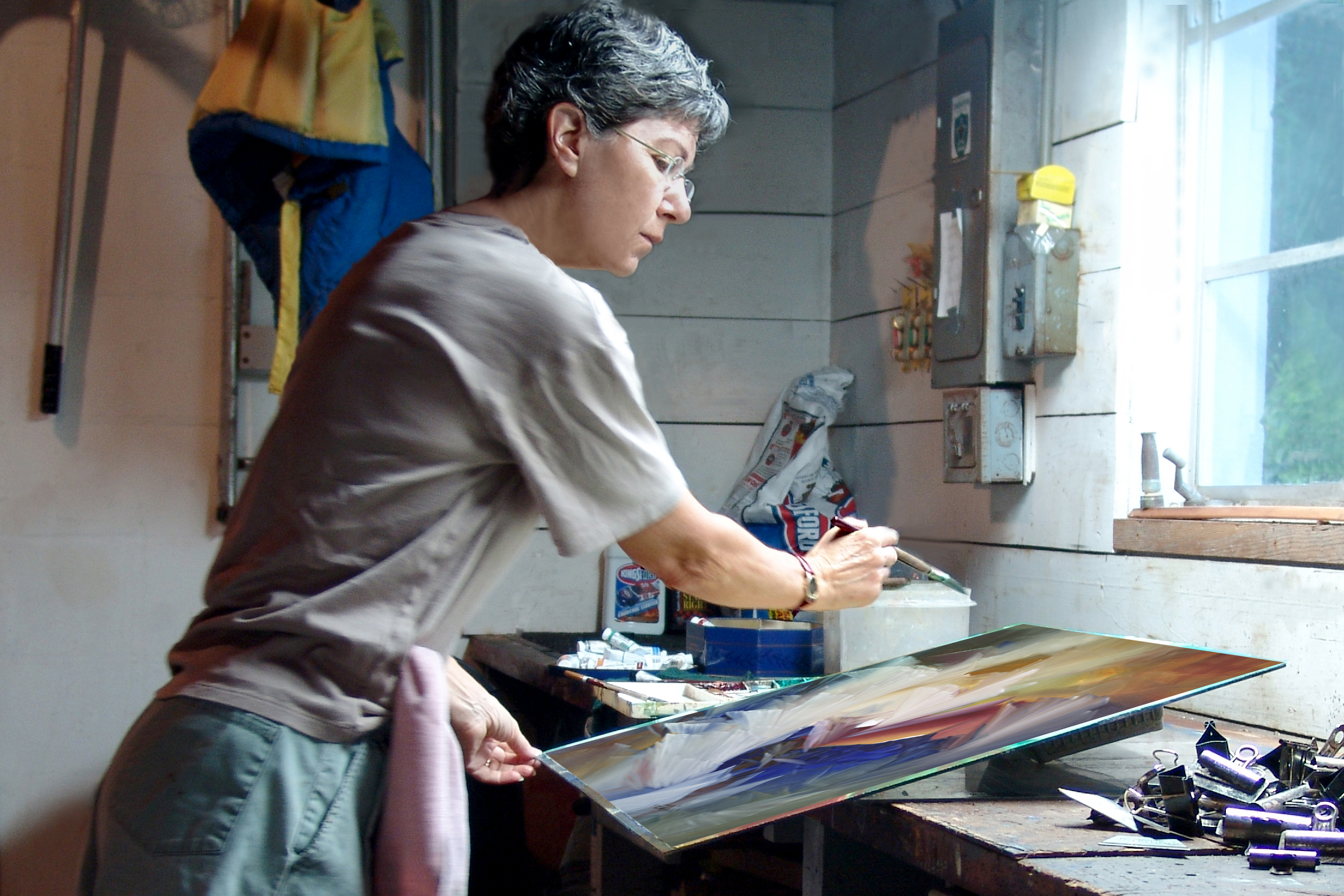
Mary Endico (born 1954)

- Mary Endico, painter, watercolorist
- Robert Gober, sculptor
- Joseph Havel, sculptor
- Mike Kelley (d. 2012), all media
- Donna Meistrich, wax carver, model maker, painter, sculptor, jewelry designer, animator
- Francis X. Pavy, painter, sculptor
- Cindy Sherman, photographer
- Michael Sherrill, ceramist, sculptor
- Kiki Smith, German-born sculptor, printmaker, all media
- Randy Souders, painter
- Fred Wilson, conceptual artist, printmaker
- David Wojnarowicz (d. 1992), painter, photographer

=== 1955 ===
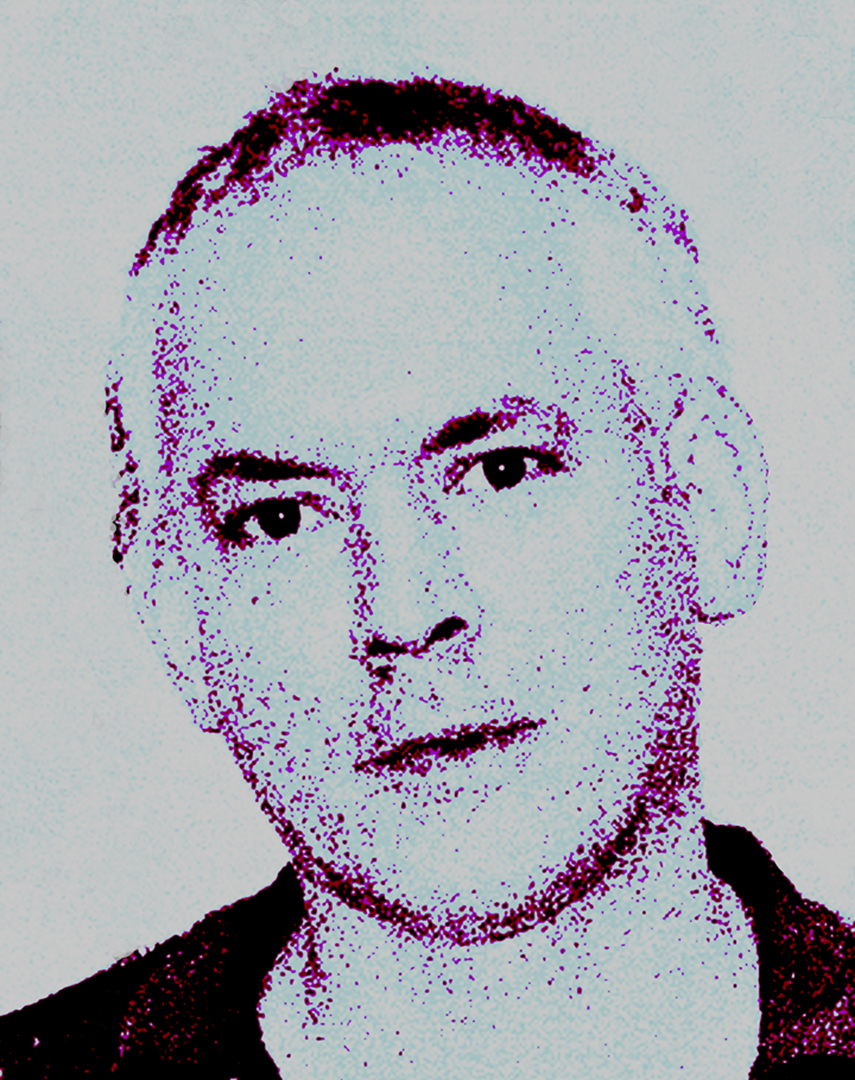
Philip Taaffe (born 1955)

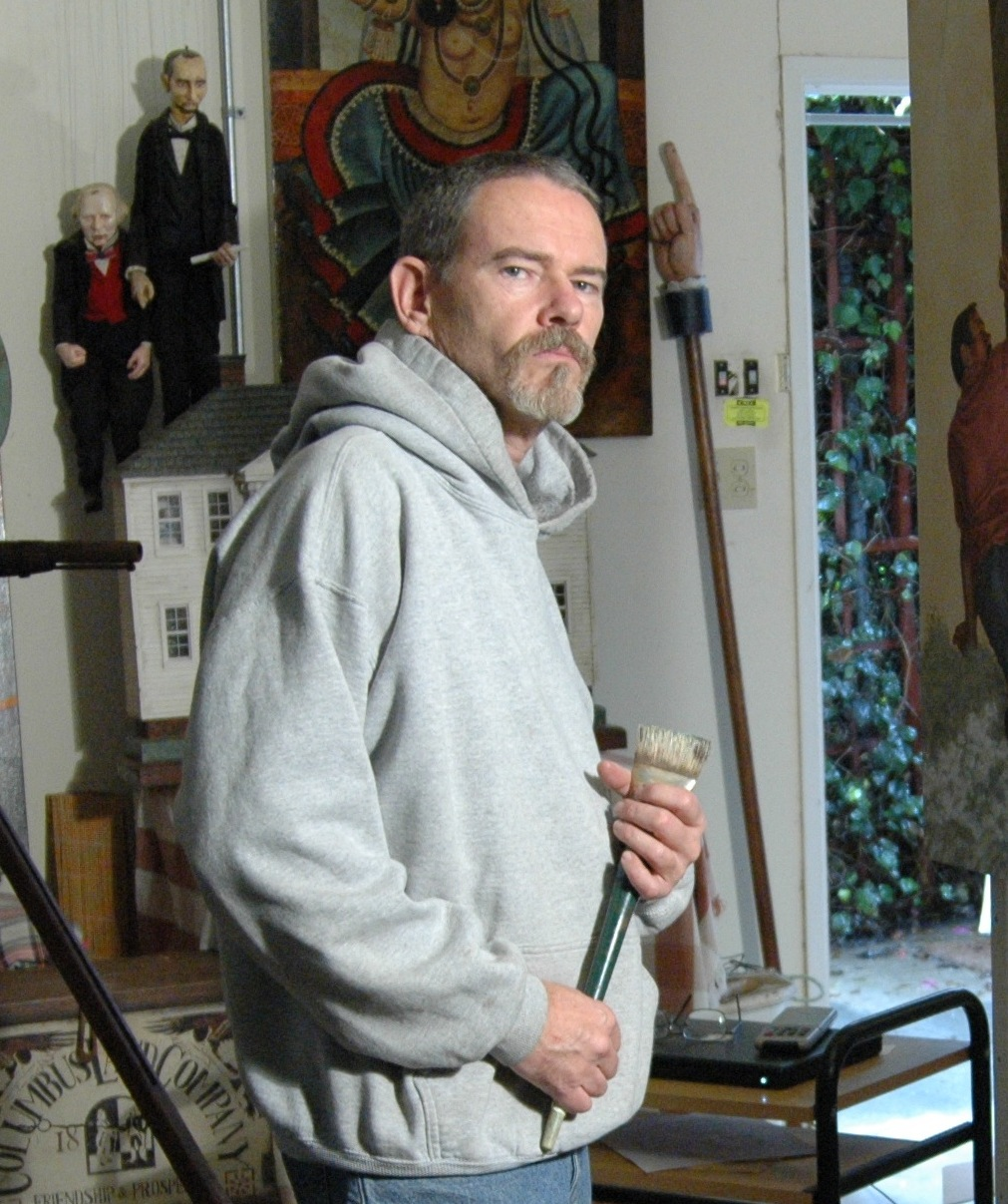
F. Scott Hess (born 1955)

- Katherine Bowling, layered landscapes
- Mark Staff Brandl, painter, installation artist, art historian
- Charles Fazzino, silkscreen serigraph pop artist
- F. Scott Hess, painter, conceptual artist
- Roni Horn, sculptor, photographer
- Terrell James, painter, sculptor
- Karen Kilimnik, painter, installation artist
- Jeff Koons, sculptor
- Christian Marclay, visual artist, composer
- Robert Lyn Nelson, marine painter
- Renee Richetts, mixed media artist
- Philip Taaffe, painter, printmaker
- David Tineo, cultural, identity issues artist
- Michael Toombs, painter, arts educator
- Jeffrey Vallance, conceptual artist
- Karen Wheeler, painter
- Richard Wyatt Jr. (d. 2024), painter, muralist

=== 1956 ===
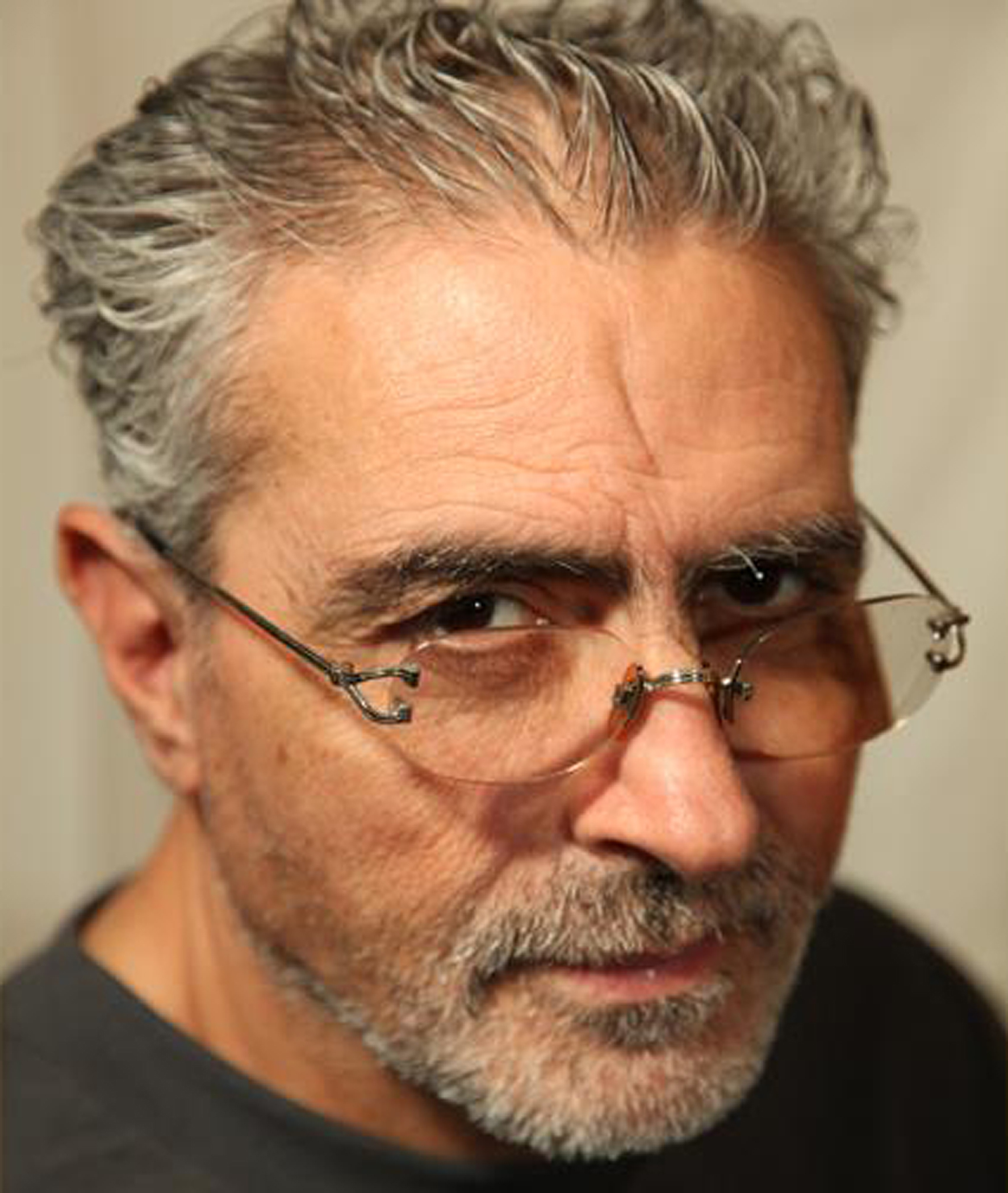
Kaloust Guedel (born 1956)

- Mark Beard, painter, sculptor, set designer
- Mark Bloch, interdisciplinary artist
- F. Lennox Campello, visual, multimedia artist
- Kaloust Guedel, painter, sculptor
- Julian Hatton, painter
- Soraida Martinez, painter
- John Randall Nelson, painter, sculptor
- Alison Saar, sculptor, installation artist
- Fred Tomaselli, painter

=== 1957 ===
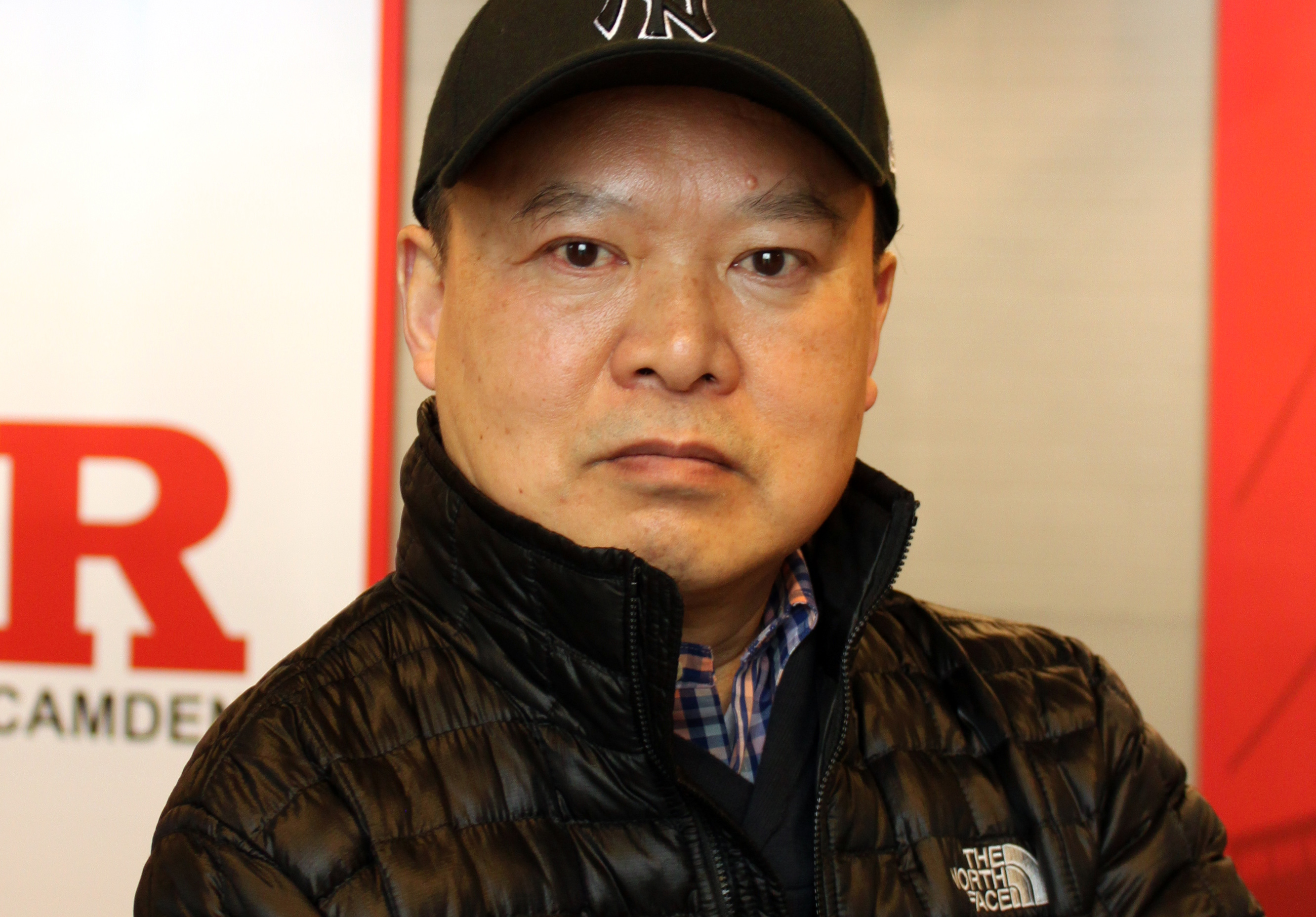
LiQin Tan (born 1957)

- Julie Ault, collaborative artist, curator
- Sarah Brayer, painter, paper artist, printmaker
- Fred Cray, photographer
- Felix Gonzalez-Torres (d. 1996), sculptor, installation artist, interdisciplinary
- Jim Hodges, sculptor
- Clay Huffman (d. 2001), painter
- Tony Oursler, video, performance, installation artist
- Adam Shaw, painter
- James Siena, painter
- LiQin Tan, digital artist, animator

=== 1958 ===
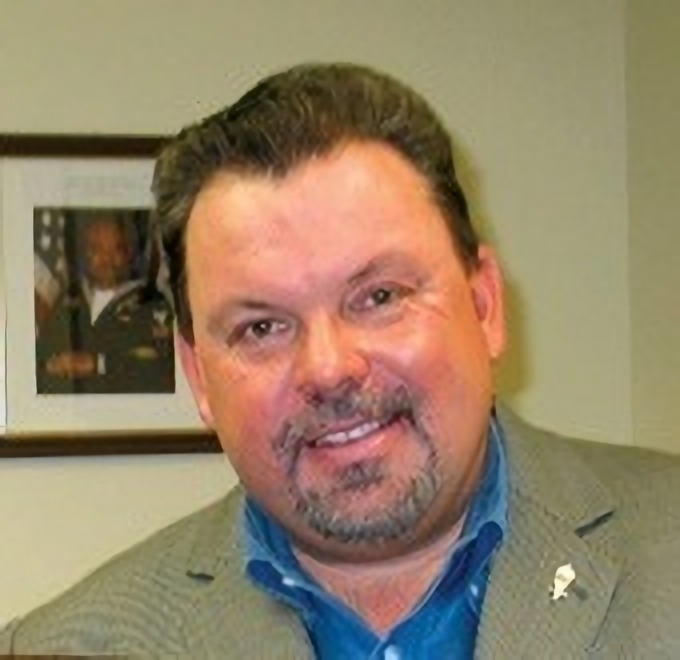
Thomas Kinkade (born 1958)

- Ben Aronson, painter
- Wayne Barlowe, science fiction, fantasy painter
- John Dubrow, painter
- Keith Haring (d. 1990), graphic artist, muralist, sculptor, printmaker
- Tracy Harris, painter
- Wendy W. Jacob, sculptor
- Thomas Kinkade (d. 2012), painter
- Christie Repasy, floral painter
- James Romberger, pastels, comics
- Moses Ros, architect, sculptor, painter, printmaker, muralist
- Kenny Scharf, painter
- Renee Stout, assemblagist
- Ray Turner, painter, portraits, landscapes
- Jeff Wassmann, assemblage
- Francesca Woodman (d. 1981), photographer

=== 1959 ===
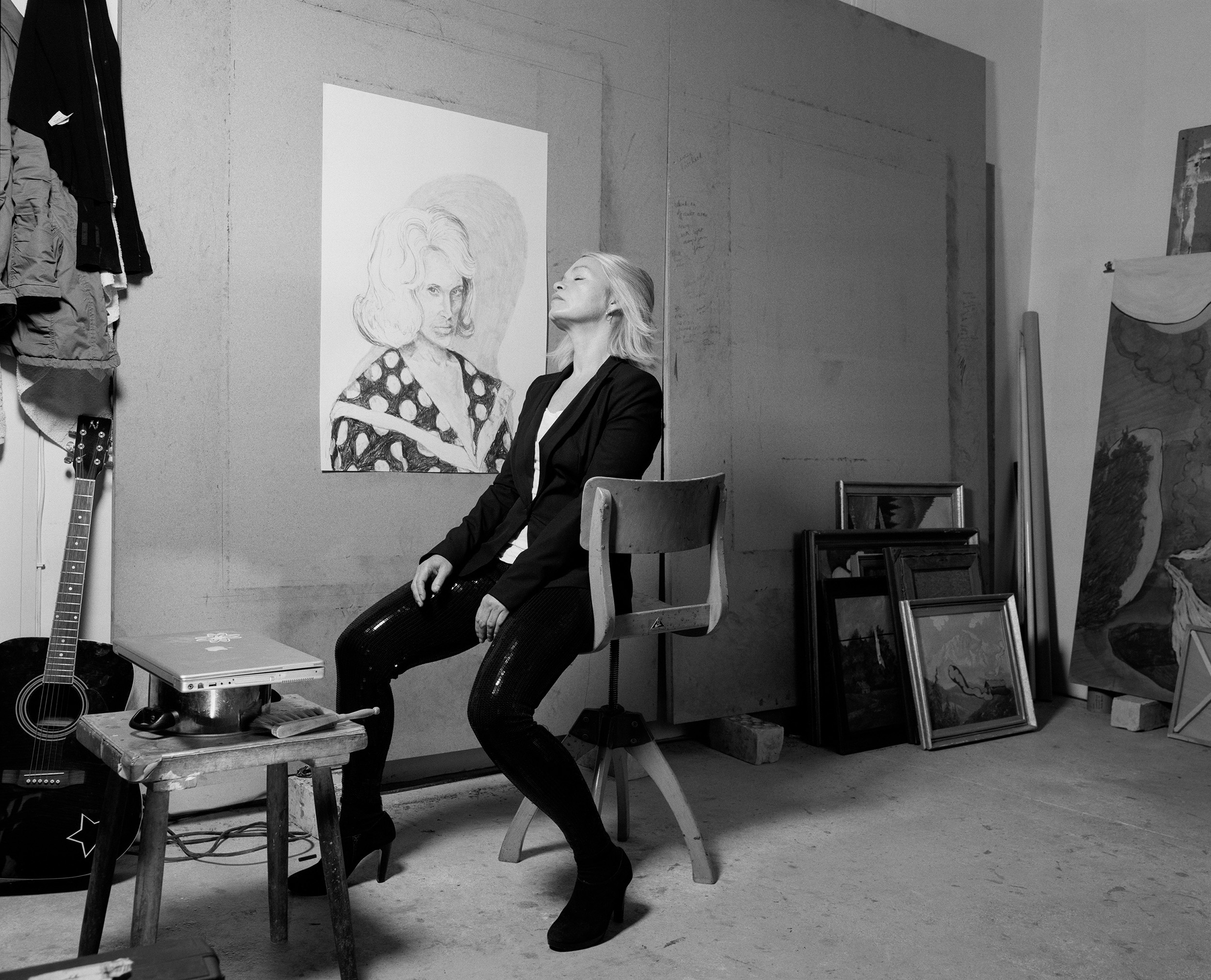
Laura Bruce (born 1959)

- Ashley Bickerton (d. 2022), painter, sculptor
- Laura Bruce, painter, sculptor, installation and performance artist
- Anne Chu (d. 2016), sculptor
- Donny Johnson, abstract painter, murderer
- Maya Lin, installation artist
- Raymond Persinger, sculptor, public artist
- Jessica Stockholder, sculptor, installation artist
- Jerry Weiss, painter

== Born 1960–1969 ==
=== 1960 ===
- Elliott Arkin, sculptor
- Jean-Michel Basquiat (d. 1988), painter
- Bob Eggleton, science fiction, fantasy, horror artist.
- Laura Ann Jacobs, sculptor, mixed media artist.
- MaPo Kinnord, ceramist, sculptor, educator.
- Glenn Ligon, conceptual artist, all media
- Sono Osato, artist
- Jack Pierson, sculptor, photographer, other media
- Lorna Simpson, photographer
- Tim Tate multimedia sculptor, video artist

=== 1961 ===
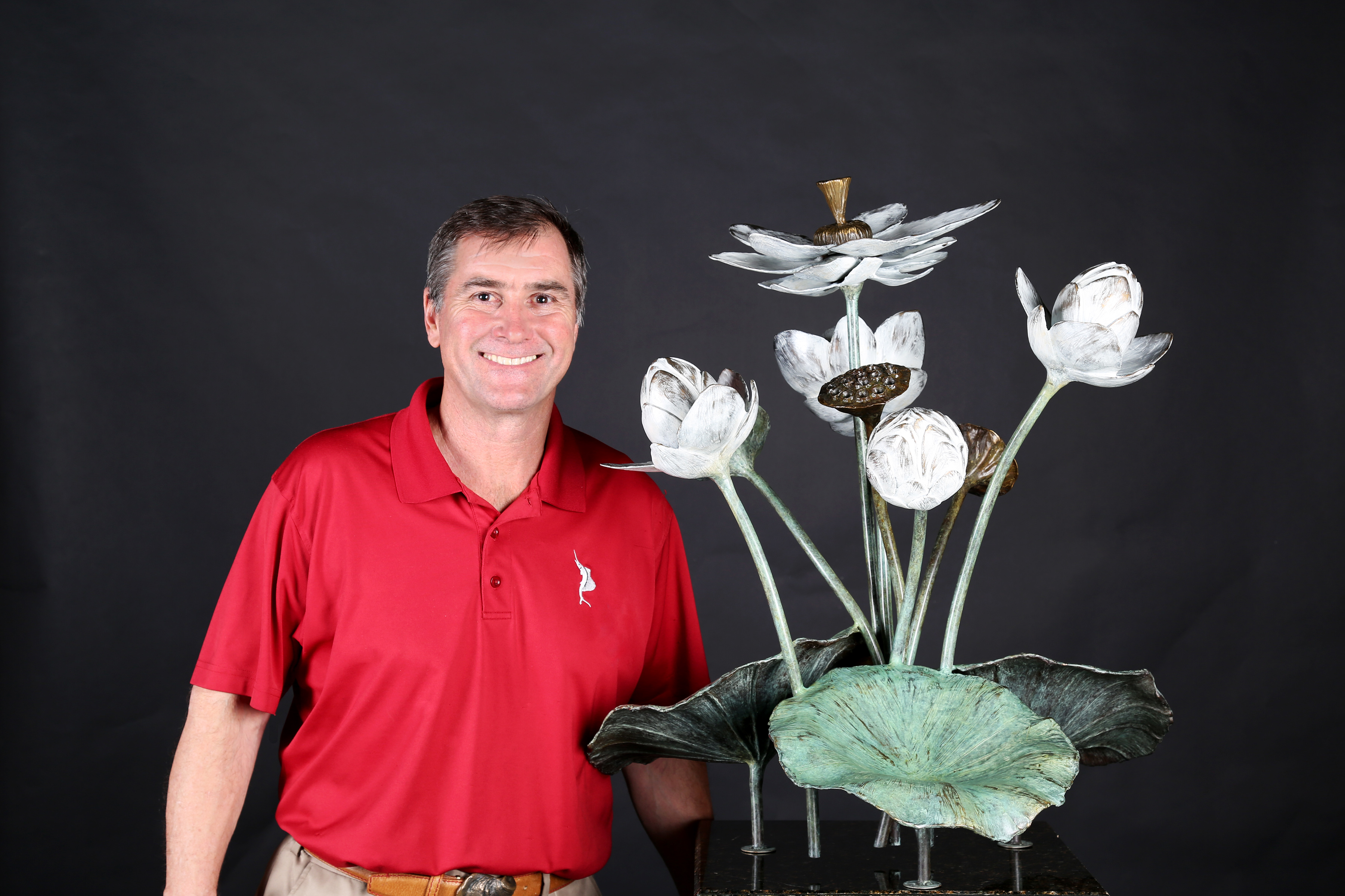
Geoffrey C. Smith (sculptor) (born 1961)

- Pierce Boshelly, painter, sculptor
- Steve Brudniak, sculptor, actor, musician
- Sam Durant, multimedia artist
- Nestor Hernández (d. 2006), photographer
- Zoe Leonard, photographer, visual artist
- Catherine Opie, photographer
- Geoffrey C. Smith, sculptor
- Rirkrit Tiravanija, Argentinian-born conceptual and installation artist
- Israel Tsvaygenbaum, Russian-born painter

=== 1962 ===
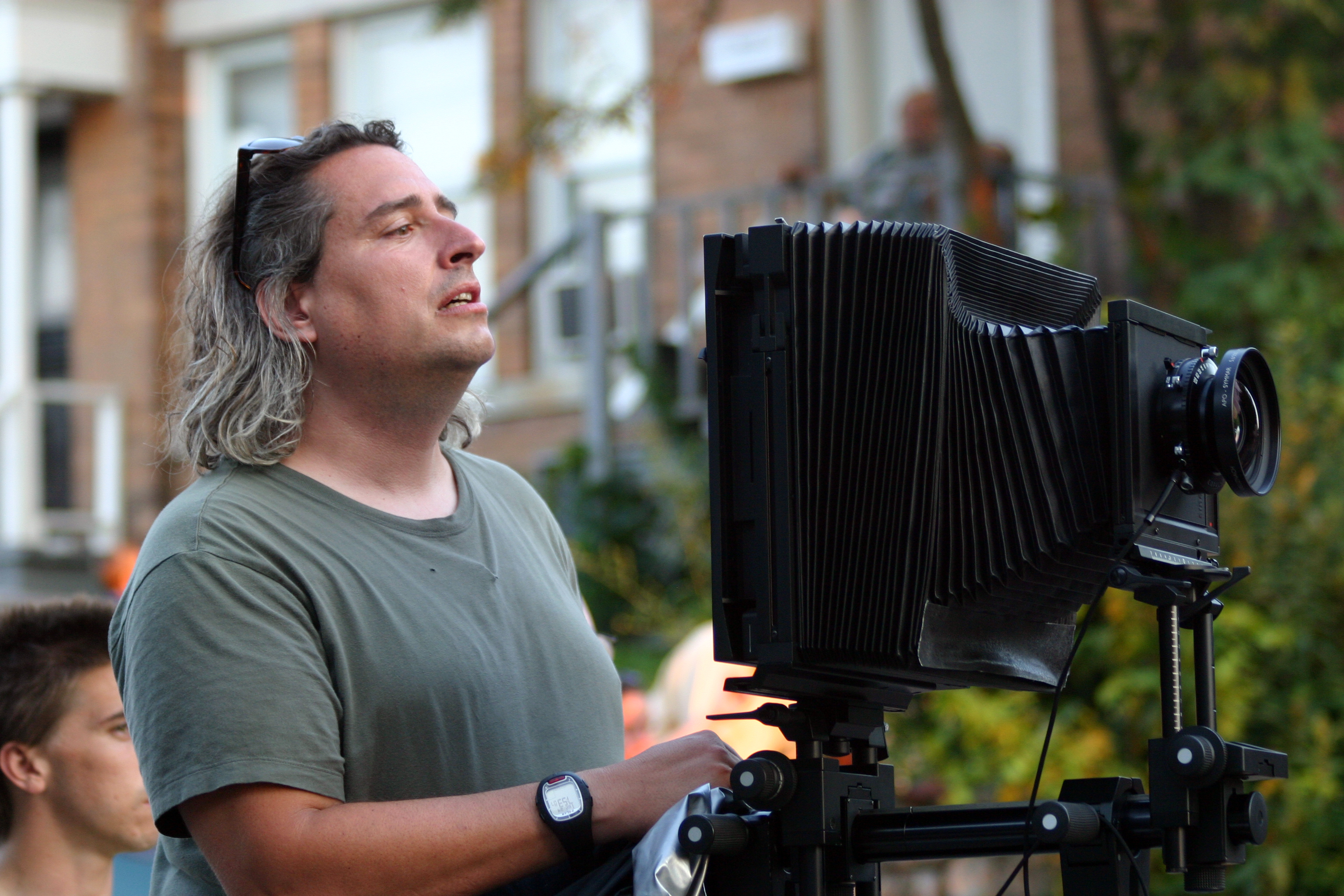
Gregory Crewdson (born 1962)

- Daniel Adel, painter, illustrator
- Gregory Crewdson, photographer
- John Currin, painter
- Monica Aissa Martinez, painter
- Renee McGinnis, painter
- Rebecca Jo Morales, painter
- Laura Myntti, painter
- Lisa Yuskavage, painter

=== 1963 ===
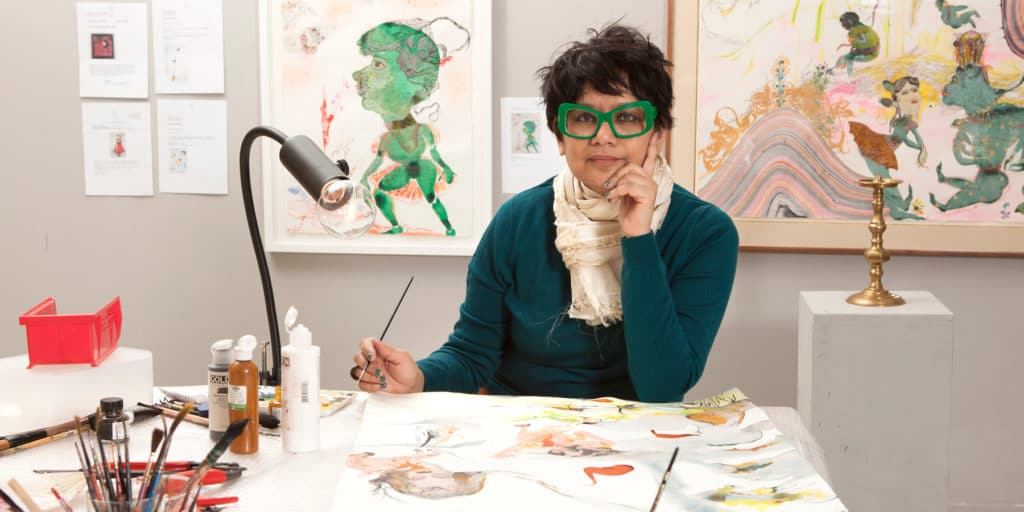
Rina Banerjee (born 1963)

- Gretchen Baer, painter, performance artist
- Rina Banerjee, Indian-born painter and sculptor
- Kathy Butterly, sculptor
- Jon Coffelt, painter, sculptor, book arts, curator
- MK Guth, installation artist
- Chris Lattanzio, artist
- Daniel Maltzman, Pop-Surrealist painter
- Paul Henry Ramirez, painter
- Spar Street, painter, sculptor

=== 1964 ===
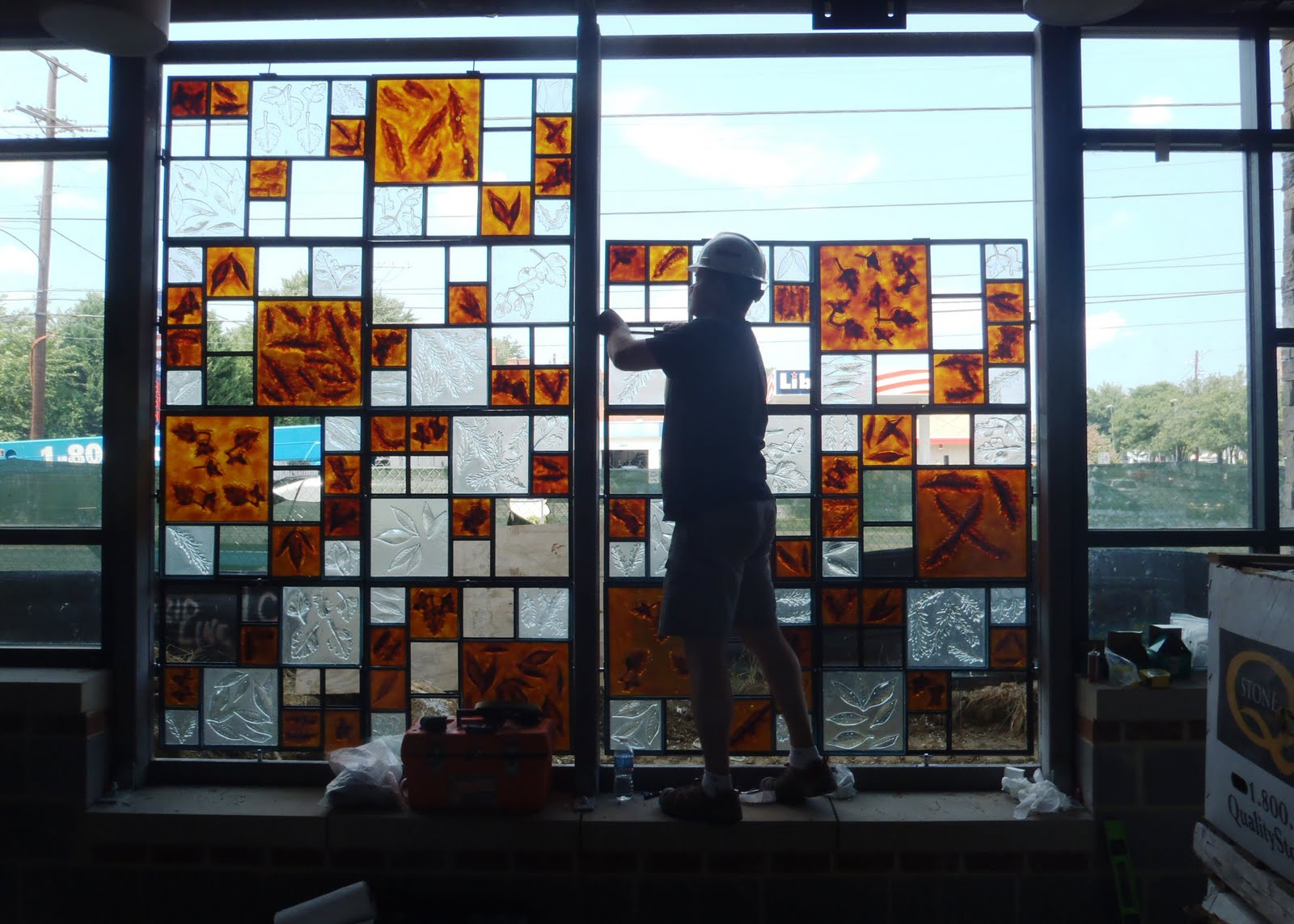
Erwin Timmers (born 1964)

- Janine Antoni, Bahamian-born sculptor, installation artist
- Thomas Arvid, oil painter
- Margarete Bagshaw (d. 2015), painter, clay artist
- Meghan Boody, surrealist artist
- Rachel Lachowicz, painter
- Ray Navarro (d. 1990), artist, filmmaker, HIV/AIDS activist
- Jason Teraoka, painter
- Erwin Timmers, Dutch-born environmental sculptor

=== 1965 ===
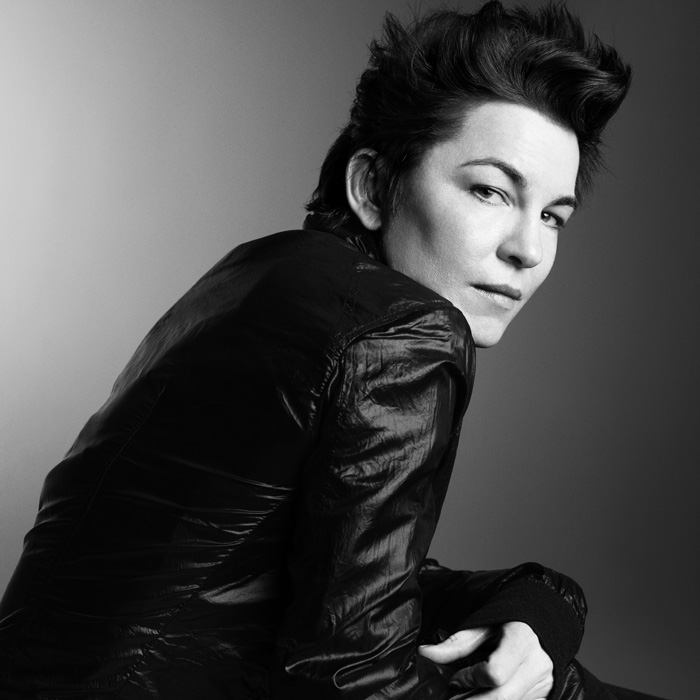
Elizabeth Peyton (born 1965)

- Andrea Fraser, performance artist
- Tom Friedman, sculptor
- Ellen Gallagher, painter, mixed media artist
- Hal Hirshorn (d. 2025), painter and photographer
- Soraya Marcano, visual artist
- Elizabeth Peyton, painter
- Jason Rhoades (d. 2006), installation artist
- Paul Rusconi, painter, mixed media artist
- Brian Rutenberg, abstract painter
- Andrea Zittel, sculptor, installation artist

=== 1966 ===
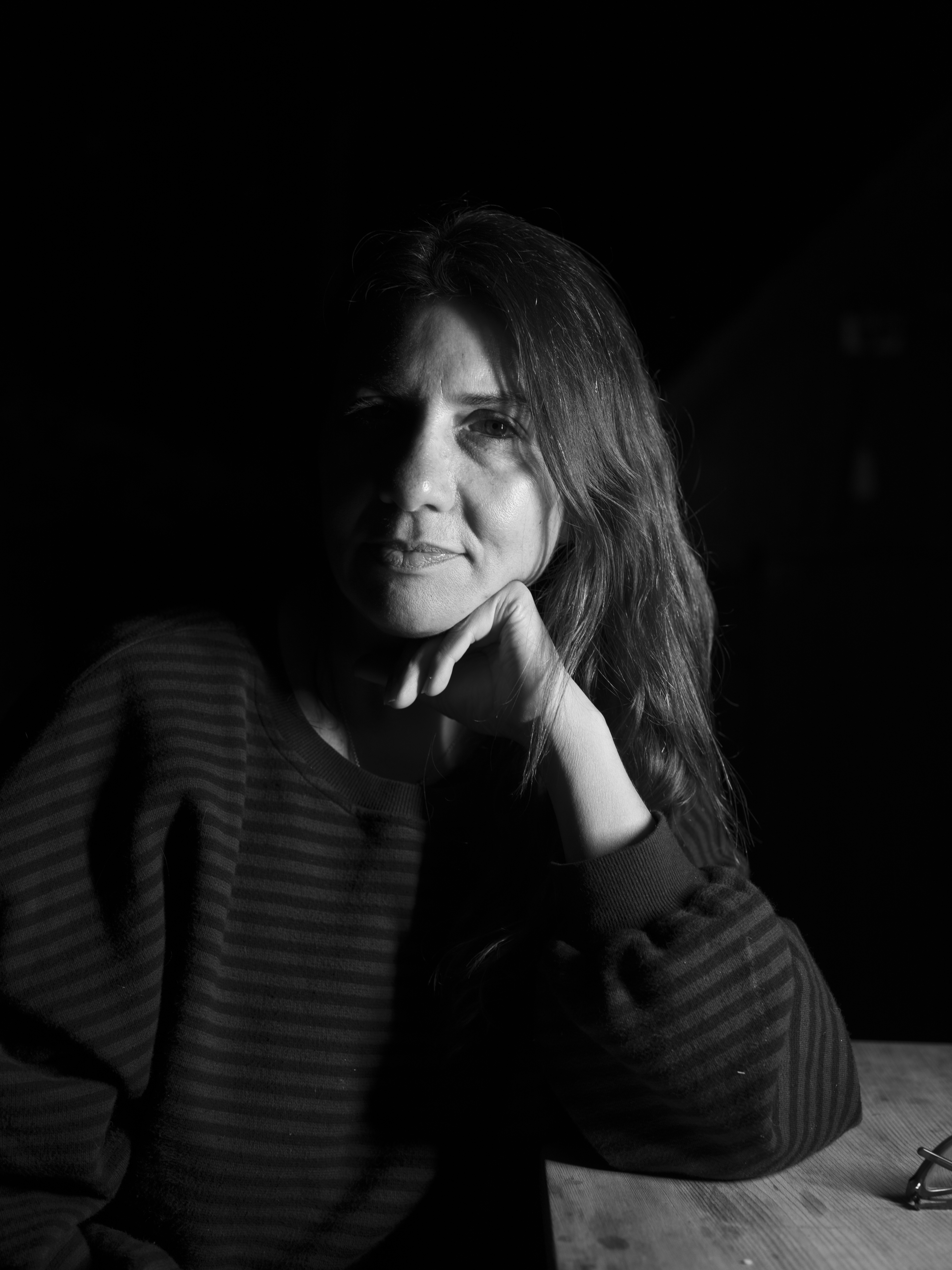
Ranu Mukherjee (born 1966)

- Margaret Boozer, ceramist
- Bela Borsodi, Austrian-born photographer
- Charlie Bynar, watercolorist
- Susanne Crane, Minnesota artist
- Rachel Harrison, sculptor, photographer
- Annette P. Jimerson, painter
- Josiah McElheny, sculptor, glass artist
- Ivan Morley, painter
- Ranu Mukherjee, multimedia artist
- Roxy Paine, sculptor, kinetic art
- Jonathan Podwil, painter

=== 1967 ===
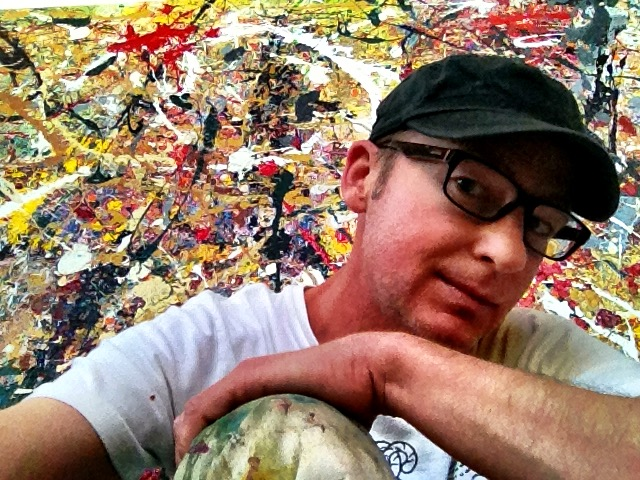
Davyd Whaley (born 1967)

- Matthew Barney, multimedia artist, sculptor, filmmaker
- Geoffrey Chadsey, painter, draftsman
- Harrell Fletcher, socially engaged interdisciplinary projects
- Simone Leigh, sculpture and social practice
- Davyd Whaley (d. 2014), painter

=== 1968 ===
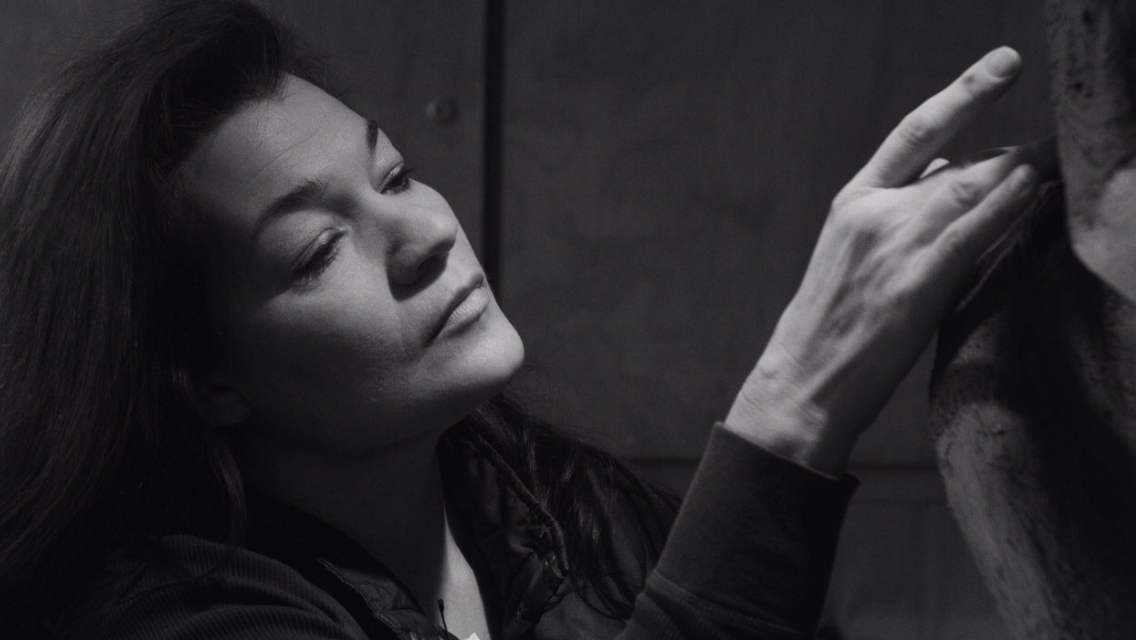
Amanda Matthews (born 1968)

- Doug Aitken, multimedia artist
- Dave Halili, painter, illustrator, designer of album covers, posters, graphic merchandise
- Amanda Matthews, sculptor, painter, public art designer
- Manuel Rivera-Ortiz, documentary photographer
- Andrew Cornell Robinson, sculptor, ceramist, painter, printmaker

=== 1969 ===
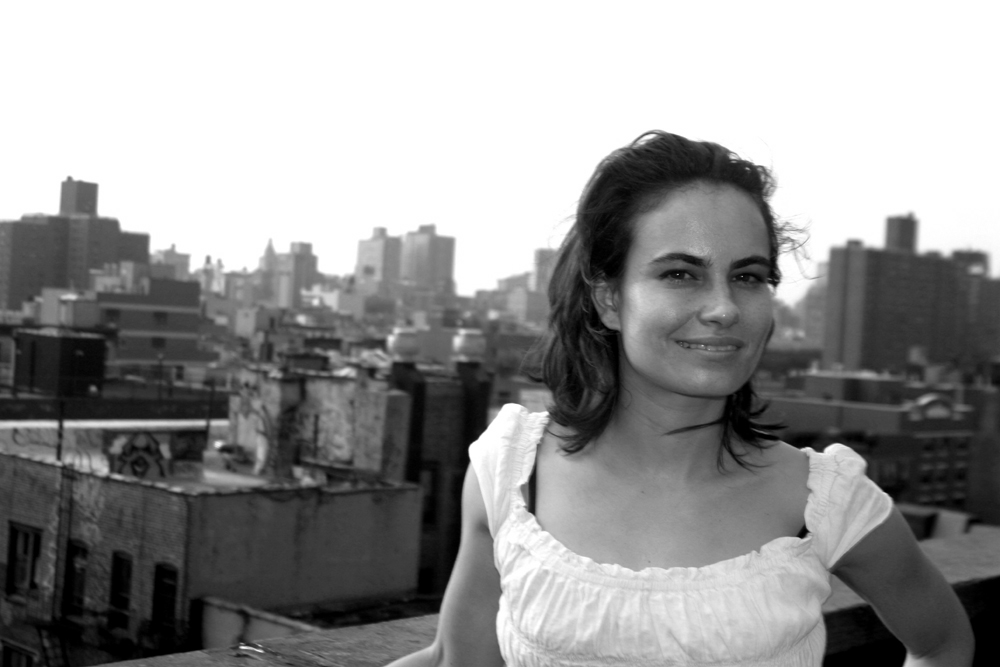
Inka Essenhigh (born 1969)

- Inka Essenhigh, painter
- Matt Kish, artist, illustrator, book cover illustrator
- Bernadette Thompson, celebrity manicurist, nail artist
- Kara Walker, collage artist, painter, printmaker, installation artist

== Born 1970–1979 ==
=== 1970 ===
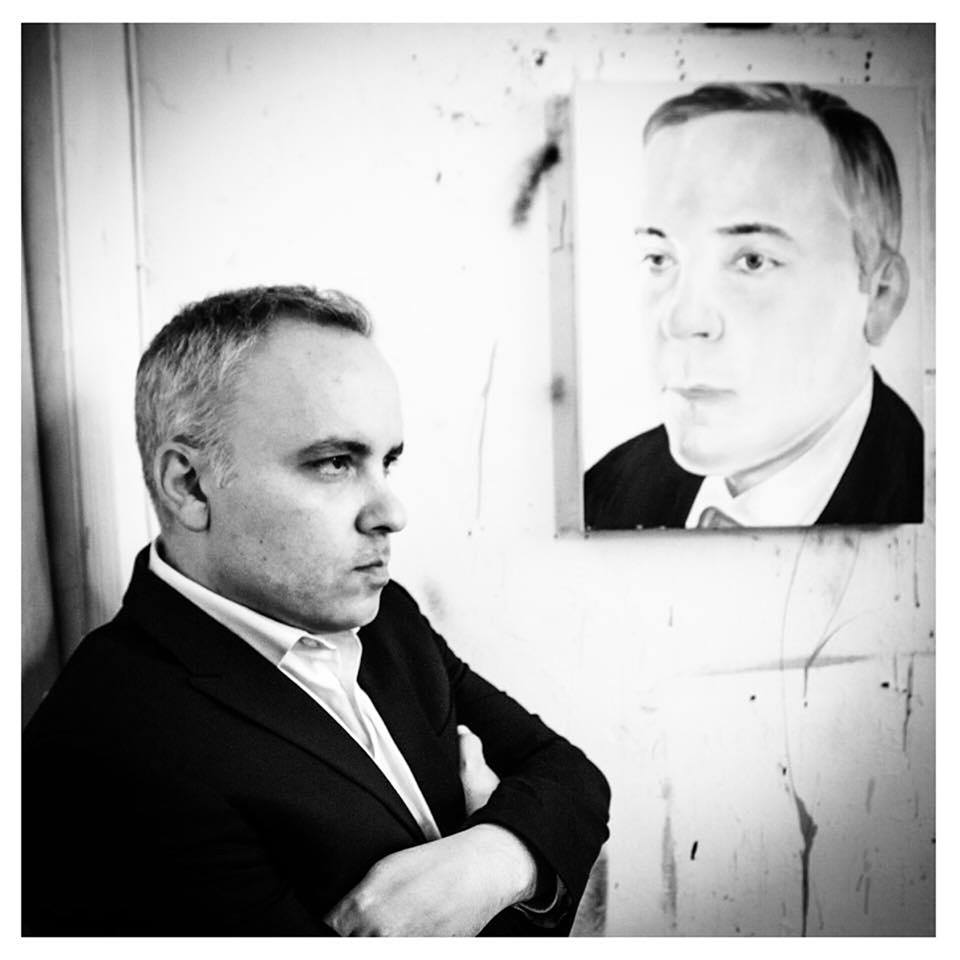
Noah Becker (born 1970)

- Noah Becker, painter, Whitehot Magazine publisher, saxophonist
- Bob Coronato, painter, printmaker
- Clandestine Culture, painter, multidisciplinary artist
- Shepard Fairey, painter, printmaker, illustrator, muralist
- Susie Frazier, mixed media
- Ron Laboray, conceptual art, painting
- Da-ka-xeen Mehner, photographer, installation artist
- John Newsom, painter

=== 1971 ===
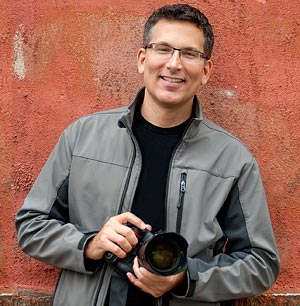
Andrew Prokos (born 1971)

- Michael Birawer, surrealist urban settings painter
- Carol Bove, sculptor
- Logan Hicks, artist
- Paul Kremer, artist
- Andrew Prokos, photographer
- Edra Soto, multidisciplinary artist
- John Waguespack, artist

=== 1972 ===
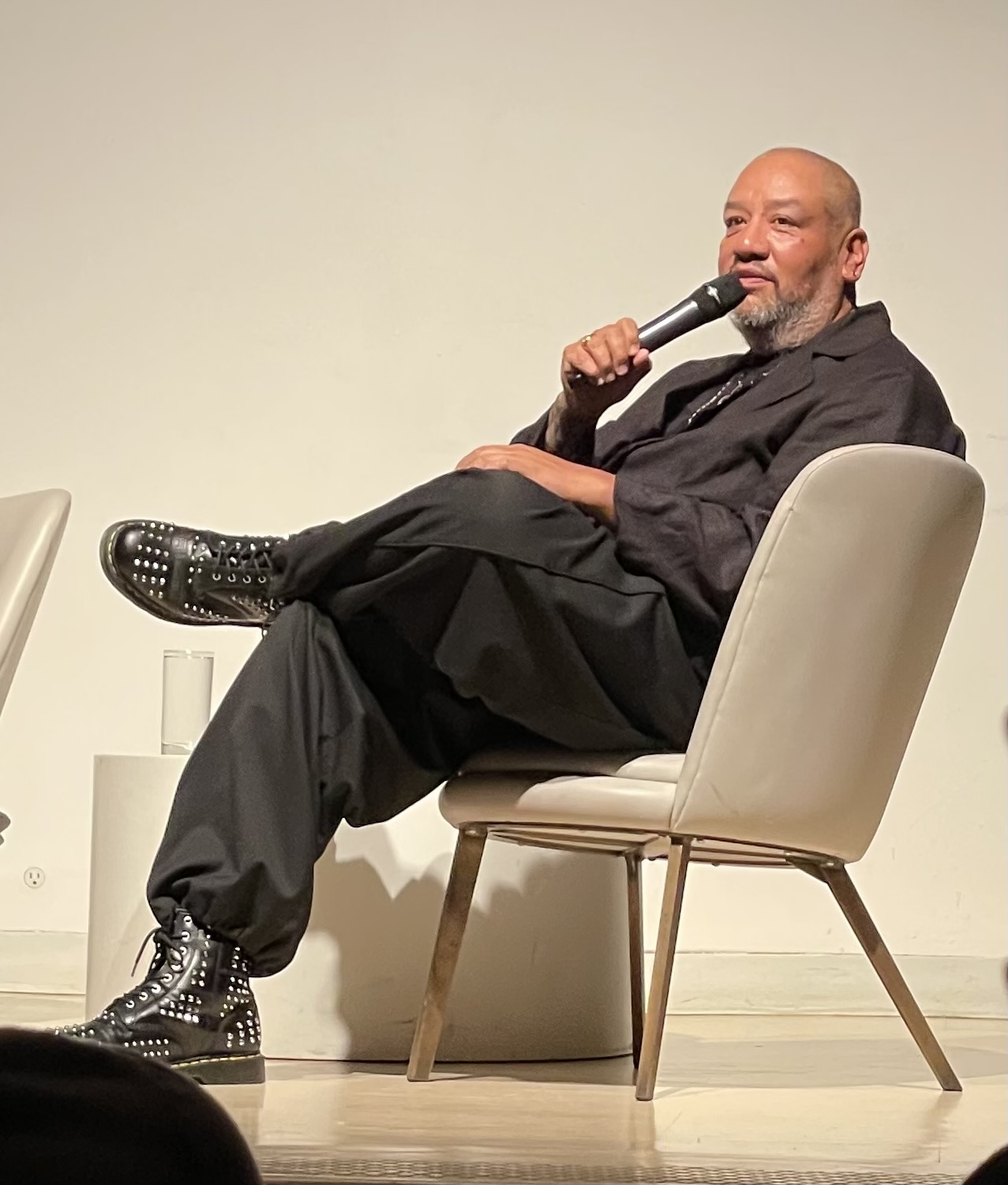
Jeffrey Gibson (born 1972)

- Jules de Balincourt, French-American nationality, painter
- J Stoner Blackwell, mixed media artist
- Jeffrey Gibson, painter, sculptor
- Letitia Huckaby, photographer, mixed media
- Monika Steiner, Swiss-born artist, sculptor
- Kelly Sueda, painter
- Erick Swenson, sculptor
- Charlie White, photographer

=== 1973 ===
- Hayley Barker, painter, drawer, spiritual experience, landscape, ritual
- Eric Forman, sculptor, installation artist
- Violet Hopkins, painter
- Pearl C. Hsiung, mixed media
- Rosy Lamb, painter, sculptor based in Paris

=== 1974 ===
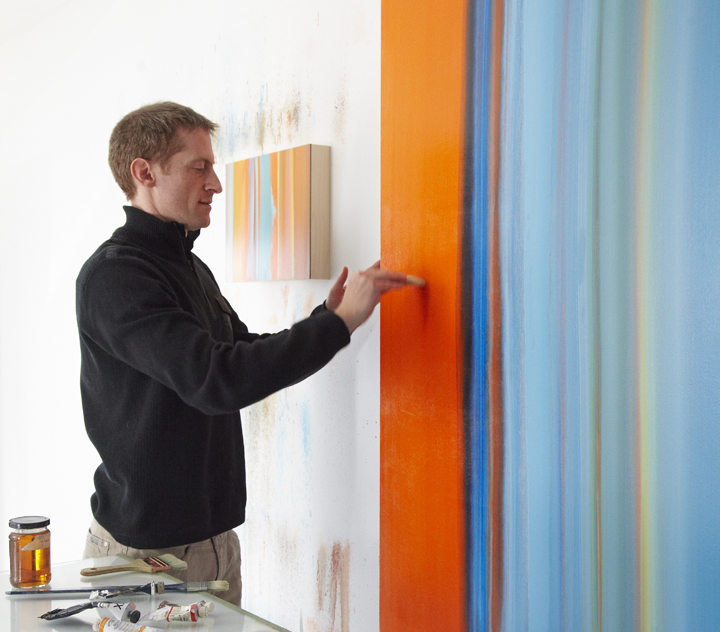
Willy Bo Richardson (born 1974)

- Carrie Ann Baade, painter
- Jason D'Aquino, painter
- Lee Kohse, painter
- Marni Kotak, performance artist
- Michael Takeo Magruder, new media, digital artist
- Aaron Padilla, ceramist, woodworker
- John Ross Palmer, painter
- Willy Bo Richardson, painter

=== 1975 ===
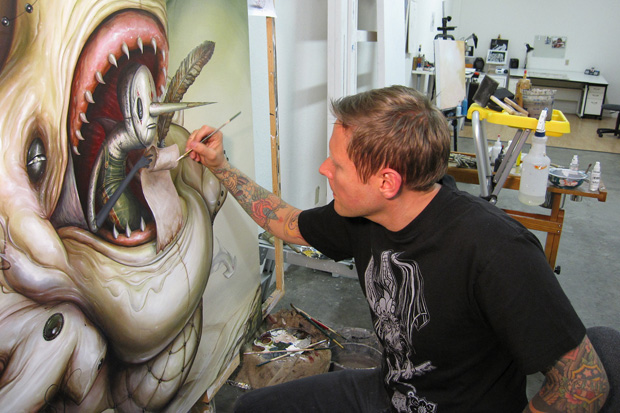
Greg Simkins (born 1975)

- Lauren Fensterstock, installation artist, sculptor, goldsmith
- Zhenya Gershman, painter and portraitist
- Jessica Todd Harper, portrait photographer
- Adreon Henry, artist
- Sedrick Huckaby, painter
- Elliott Johnson, painter, designer
- Abby Kasonik, painter
- Joshua Lutz, photographer
- Caroline Kent, abstract artist
- Patrick McGrath Muñíz, painter
- Greg Simkins, painter

=== 1976 ===
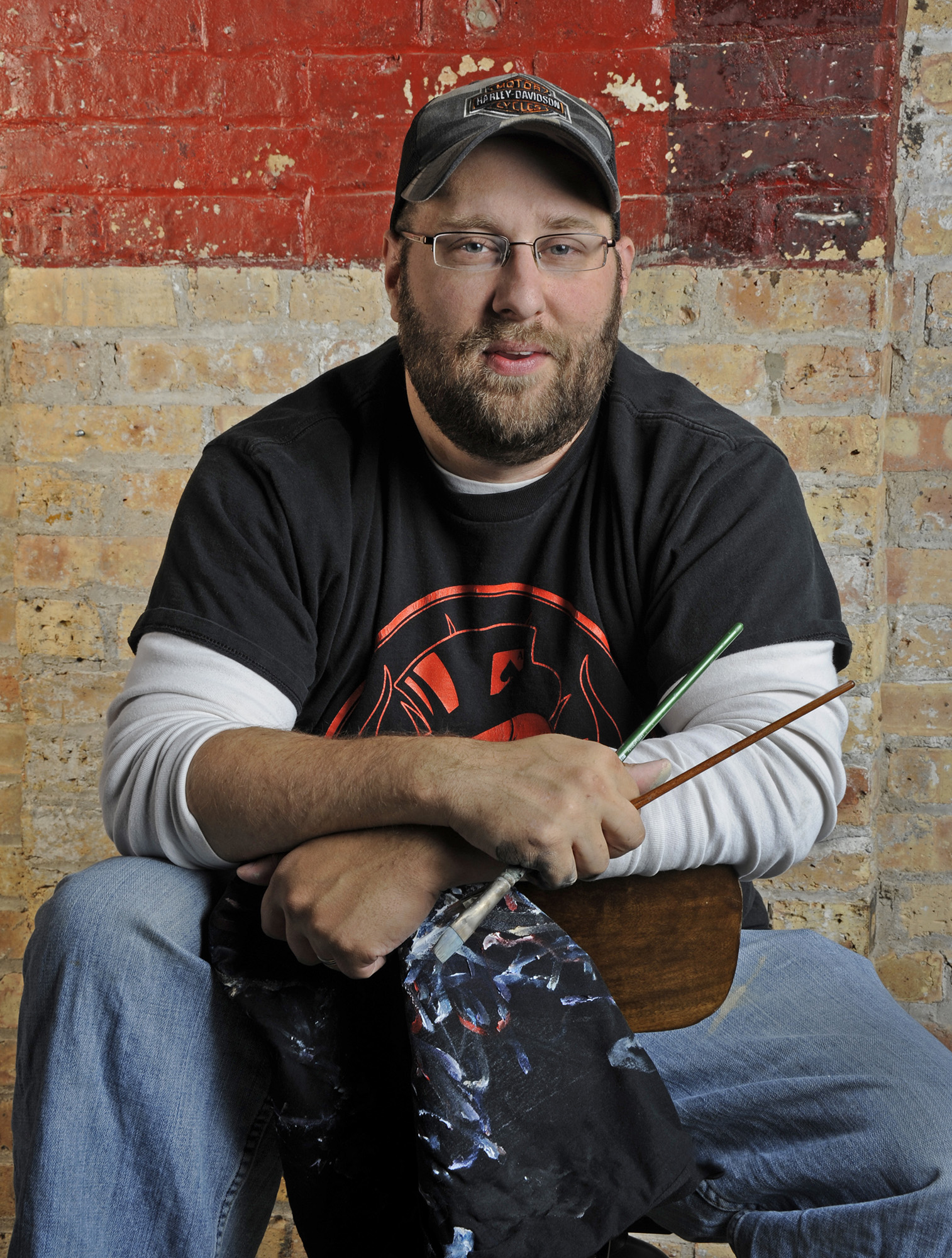
Mathew Hintz (born 1976)

- Seamus Conley, artist
- Marlon Forrester, painter, educator
- Mathew Hintz (d. 2017), impressionist painter, drawer
- Casey McKee, artist
- William Powhida, visual artist, art critic

=== 1977 ===
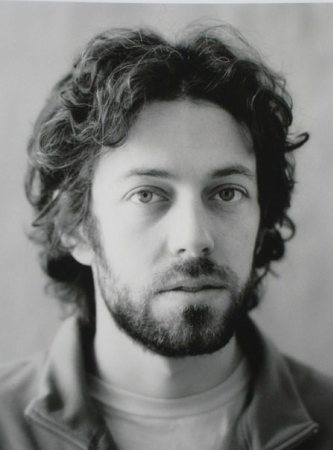
Ryder Richards (born 1977)

- Becca Bernstein, painter
- Eric Daigh, mixed media
- David Herbert, sculpture, installation, video
- Rashid Johnson, contemporary artist
- Tim Lokiec, 2D mixed media
- Ryder Richards, artist
- Michael E. Smith, sculptor
- Vadis Turner, mixed media
- Lesley Vance, painter

=== 1978 ===
- Cory Arcangel, new media artist
- Hernan Bas, painter
- Aaron Garber-Maikovska, contemporary artist
- John Kleckner, painter
- Chad Person, sculptor, collage artist

=== 1979 ===
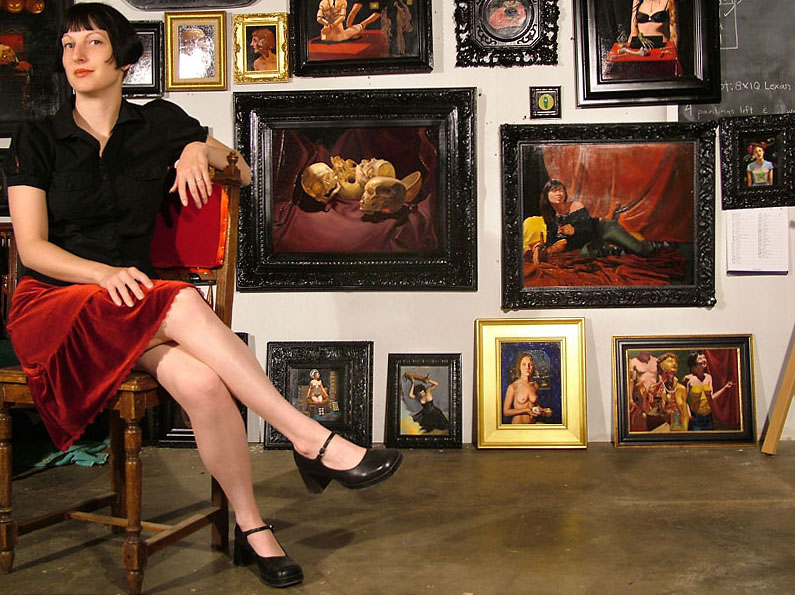
Rachel Bess (born 1979)

- Rachel Bess, painter
- Evan Gruzis, painter
- Josh Kline, sculptor and photographer
- Jimmy Kuehnle, sculpture, performance, installation
- Tameka Norris, performance artist
- Ali Prosch, sculptor, video and performance artist

== Born 1980–1989 ==
=== 1980 ===
- Kadar Brock, abstract artist
- Sarah Beth Goncarova, painter, sculptor, installation artist
- Courtney M. Leonard, multimedia artist and filmmaker
- Richard T. Scott, painter
- Michael Tarbi, artist
- Lindsey White, visual artist, photographer video, sculpture, book making
- Jordan Wolfson, visual artist, sculpture, film, installation, virtual reality

=== 1981 ===
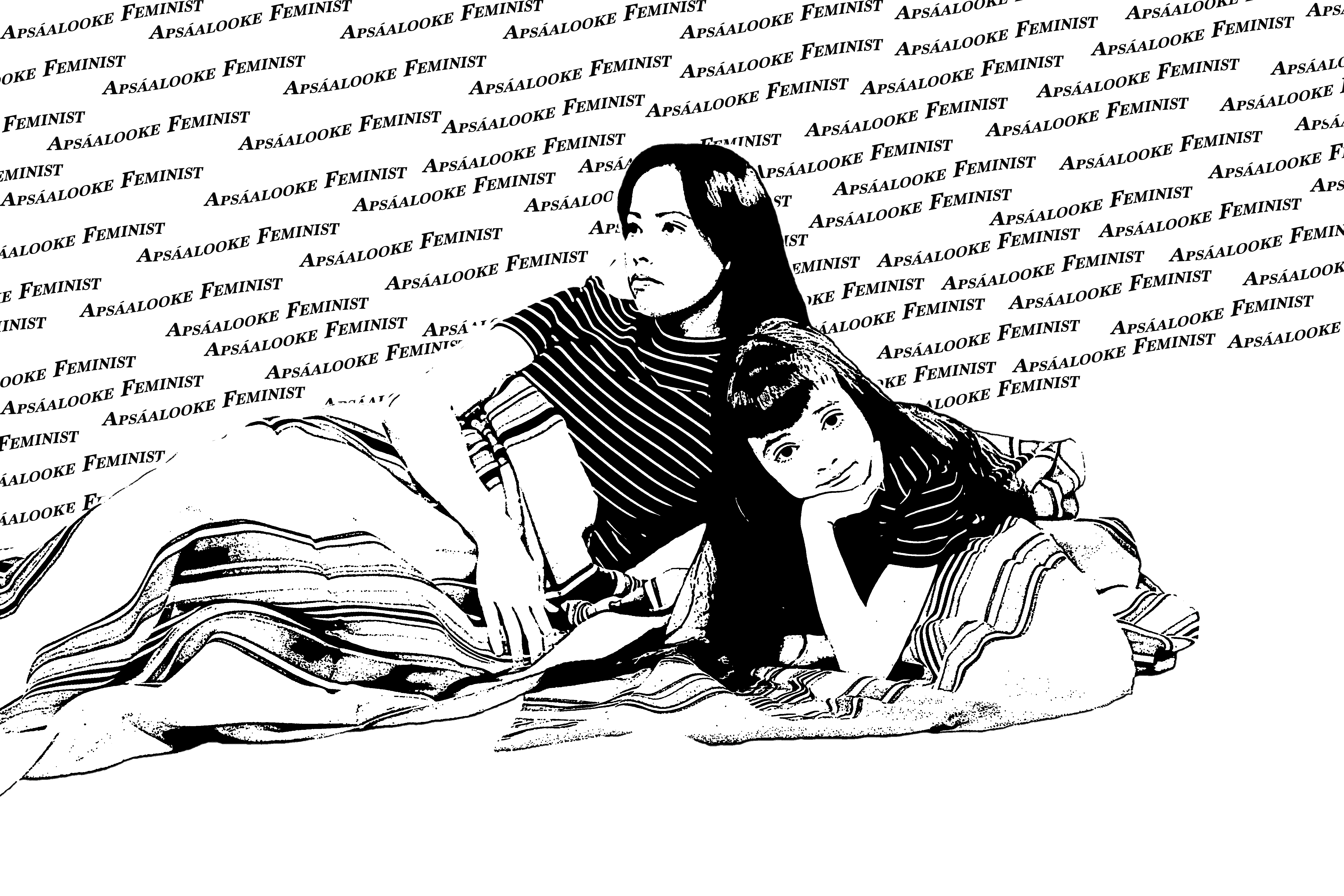
Wendy Red Star (born 1981)

- Mary Enoch Elizabeth Baxter, multimedia artist, activist
- Rafa Esparza, performance artist
- Francesca DiMattio, painter
- Sean Raspet, artist
- Wendy Red Star, multimedia artist
- Dash Snow (d. 2009), artist

=== 1982 ===
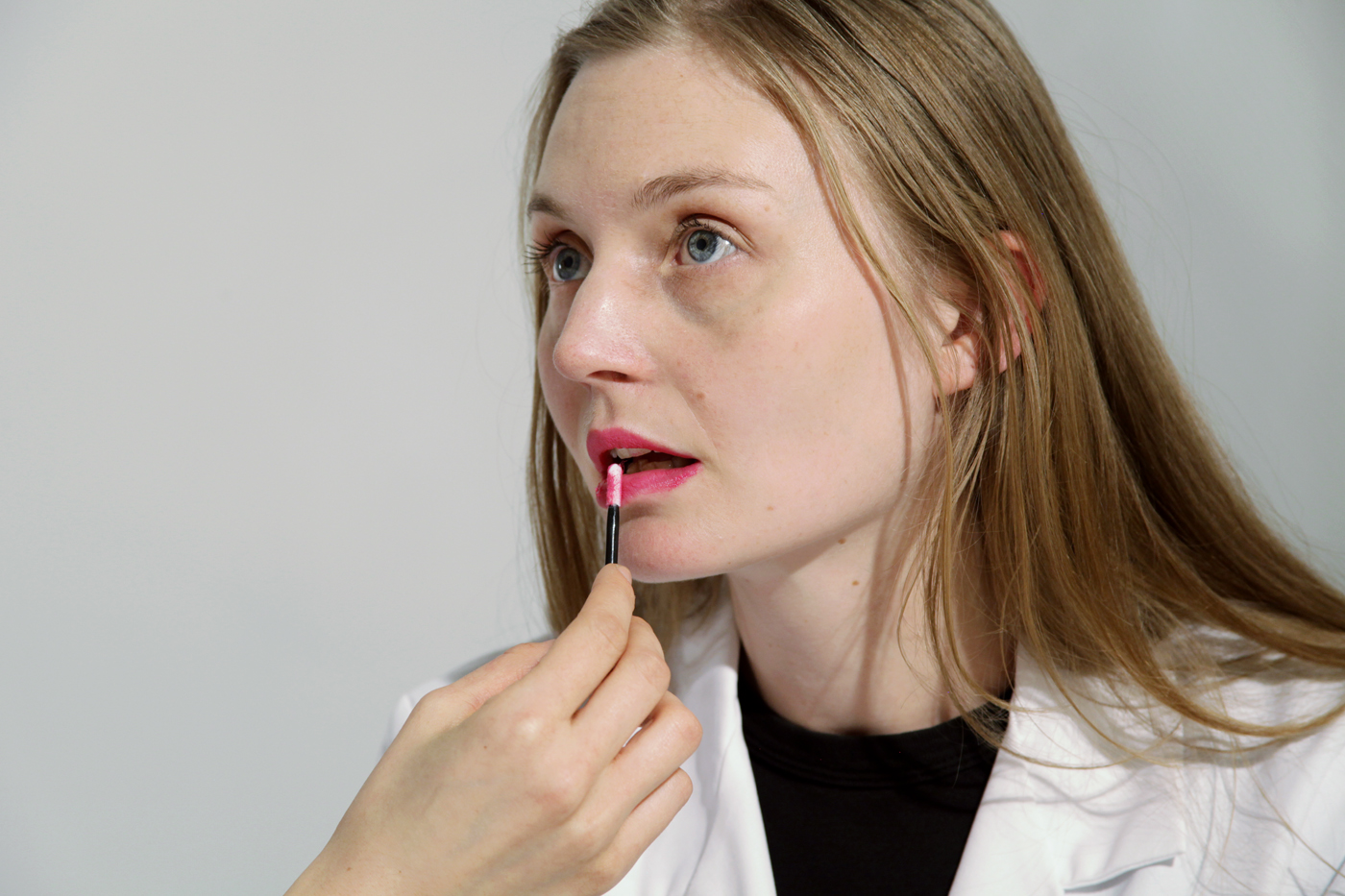
Heather Dewey-Hagborg (born 1982)

- Heather Dewey-Hagborg, forensic artist, bio-hacker
- David Gilbert (artist), contemporary photographer
- Wu Tsang, filmmaker, performance artist

=== 1983 ===
- Nick Doyle, visual artist
- Liza Sylvestre, visual artist

=== 1986 ===
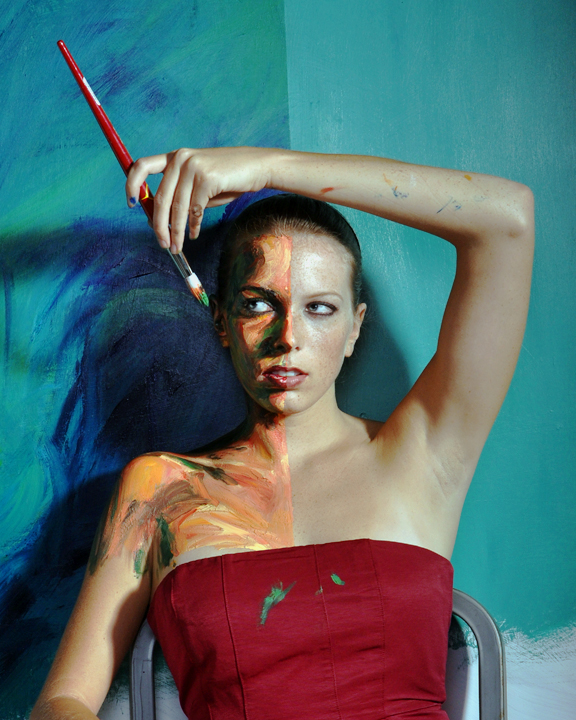
Alexa Meade (born 1986)

- Aleah Chapin, portrait painter
- Alexa Meade, body artist
- Brenna Murphy, psychedelic visual forms combined with three-dimensional object
- Sondra Perry, video artist
- Jacolby Satterwhite, artist

=== 1987 ===
- Autumn Casey, multimedia artist
- Kour Pour, painter
- Albert Samreth, multimedia artist
- Lauren Silva, painter
- Eric Moed, public artist

=== 1988 ===
- Everitte Barbee, artist, Arabic calligrapher

=== 1989 ===
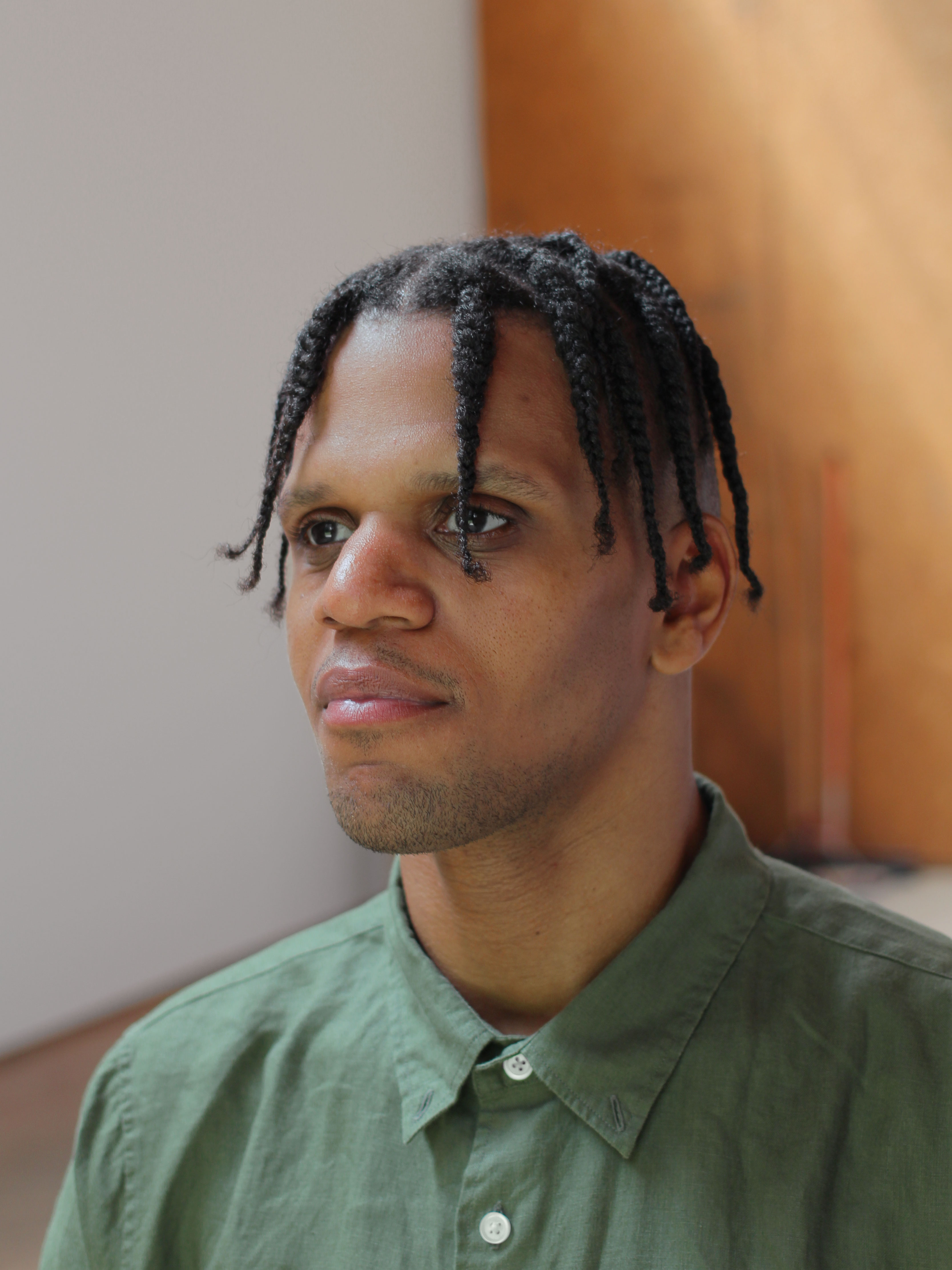
American Artist (born 1989)

- American Artist, new media, installation artist
- Ari Glass, painter, designer, musician
- Honor Titus, painter

== Born 1990–1999 ==
=== 1990 ===
- Clotilde Jiménez, artist

=== 1992 ===
- George Pocheptsov, painter, draughtsman

=== 1993 ===
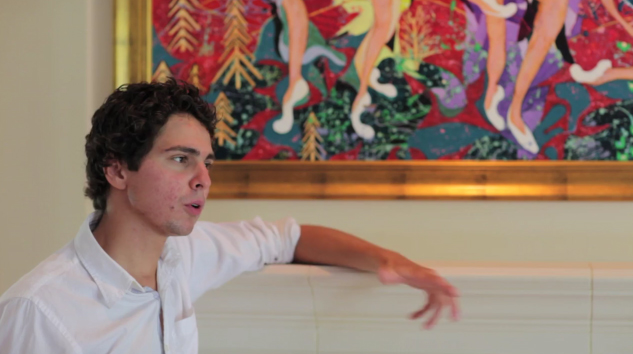
George Pocheptsov (born 1993)

- Isabelle Brourman, mixed media artist, courtroom sketch artist

=== 1995 ===
- Patricia Renee' Thomas, painter, draftswoman, art educator

=== 1998 ===
- Sasha Gordon, painter

== Date of birth unknown ==
- Michele Banks, painter
- Aisha Tandiwe Bell, mixed media
- Rora Blue, installation, text-based, interactive
- Dorothy Braudy, artist
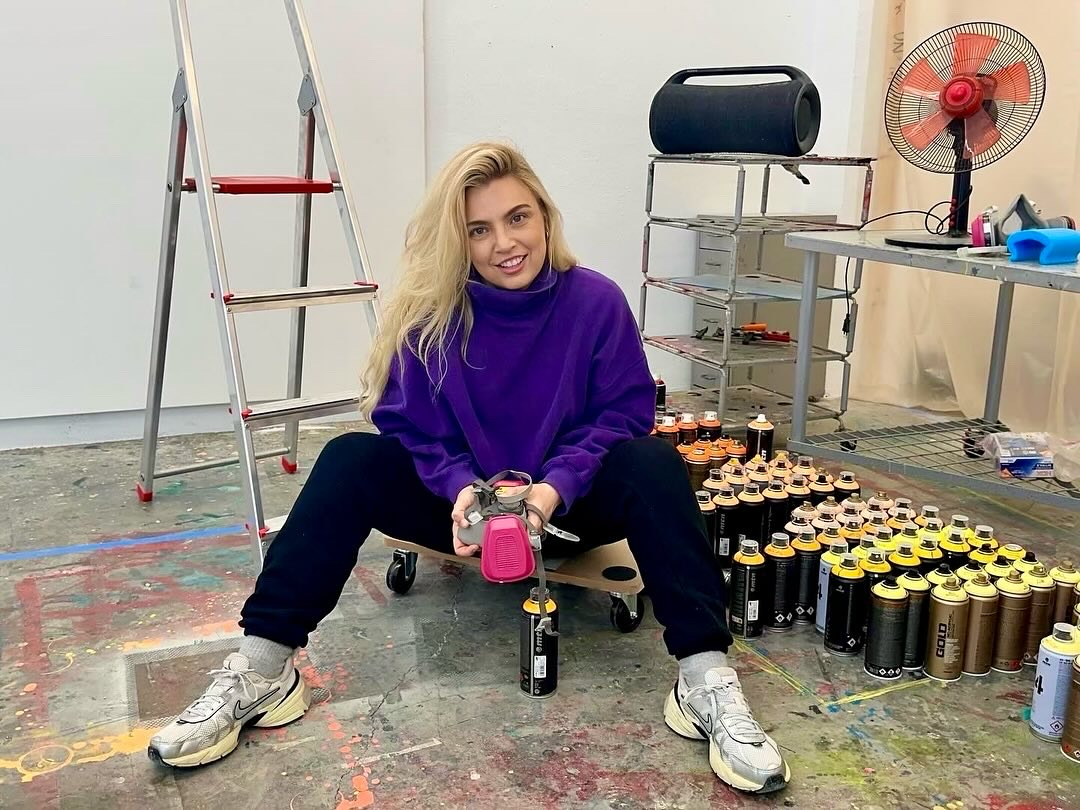
- Andrea Marie Breiling
  Andrea Marie Breiling, painter
- Nancy Calef, figurative painter
- Sheila Cameron, artist, graphic designer
- Pritika Chowdhry, Indian-born artist
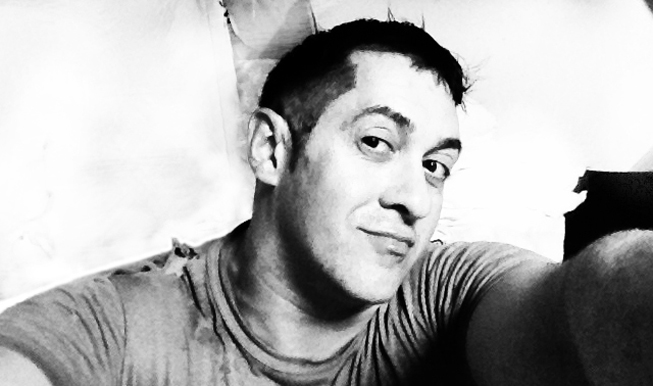
- Adam Cooley
  Adam Cooley, painter, sculptor
- Rosetta DeBerardinis, painter
- Michael D. Fay, war, combat artist
- Chawky Frenn, painter, art professor
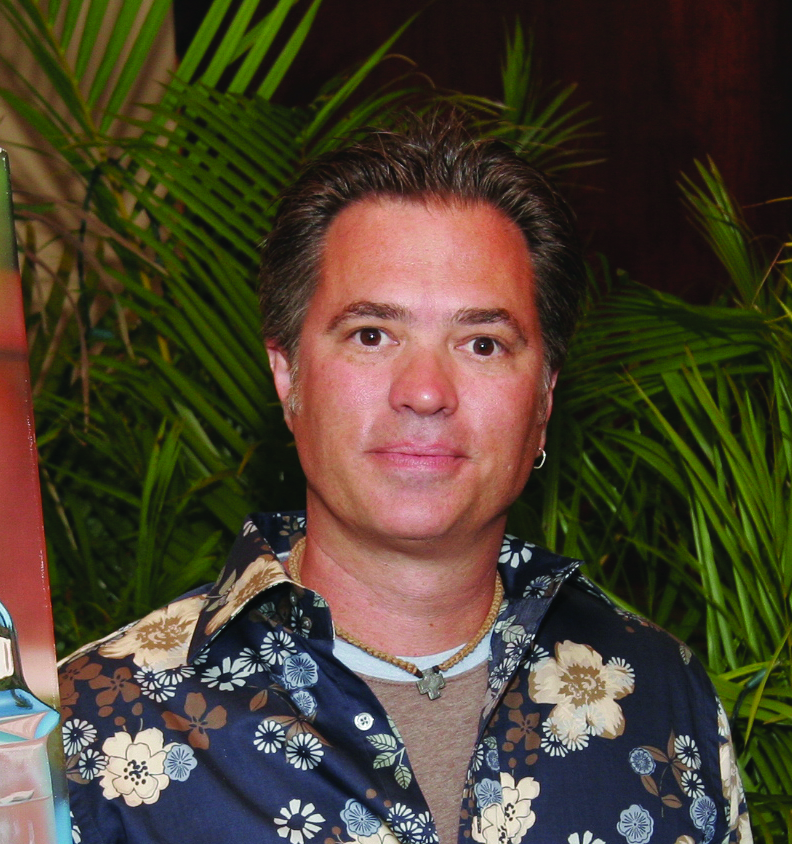
- Scott Jacobs
  Scott Jacobs, photorealist painter, actor
- Hedy Klineman, celebrity portraits
- Llanakila, painter, digital artist
- Don H. Marr, painter, romantic realism, sociocomic surrealism
- Scape Martinez, abstract artist, muralist
- Betty Merken, painter, printmaker, abstract geometric monotypes
- Pamela Nelson, contemporary painter, installation artist
- Hal Olsen, artist
- Perry Picasshoe, painter, photographer, textile artist, social media influencer
- David Wells Roth, figurative painter
- Caitlin Rose Sweet, ceramist
- Mia Tavonatti, mosaic artist and writer

== See also ==
- American Art
- Native American artists
- African American art
- List of African-American visual artists
- Sculpture of the United States
- Hudson River School
- Luminism
- American Impressionism
- American scene painting
- Regionalism
- WPA Federal Art Project
- Northwest School
- Fluxus
- Intermedia
