= Albert Boime =

American art historian and professor (1933–2008)

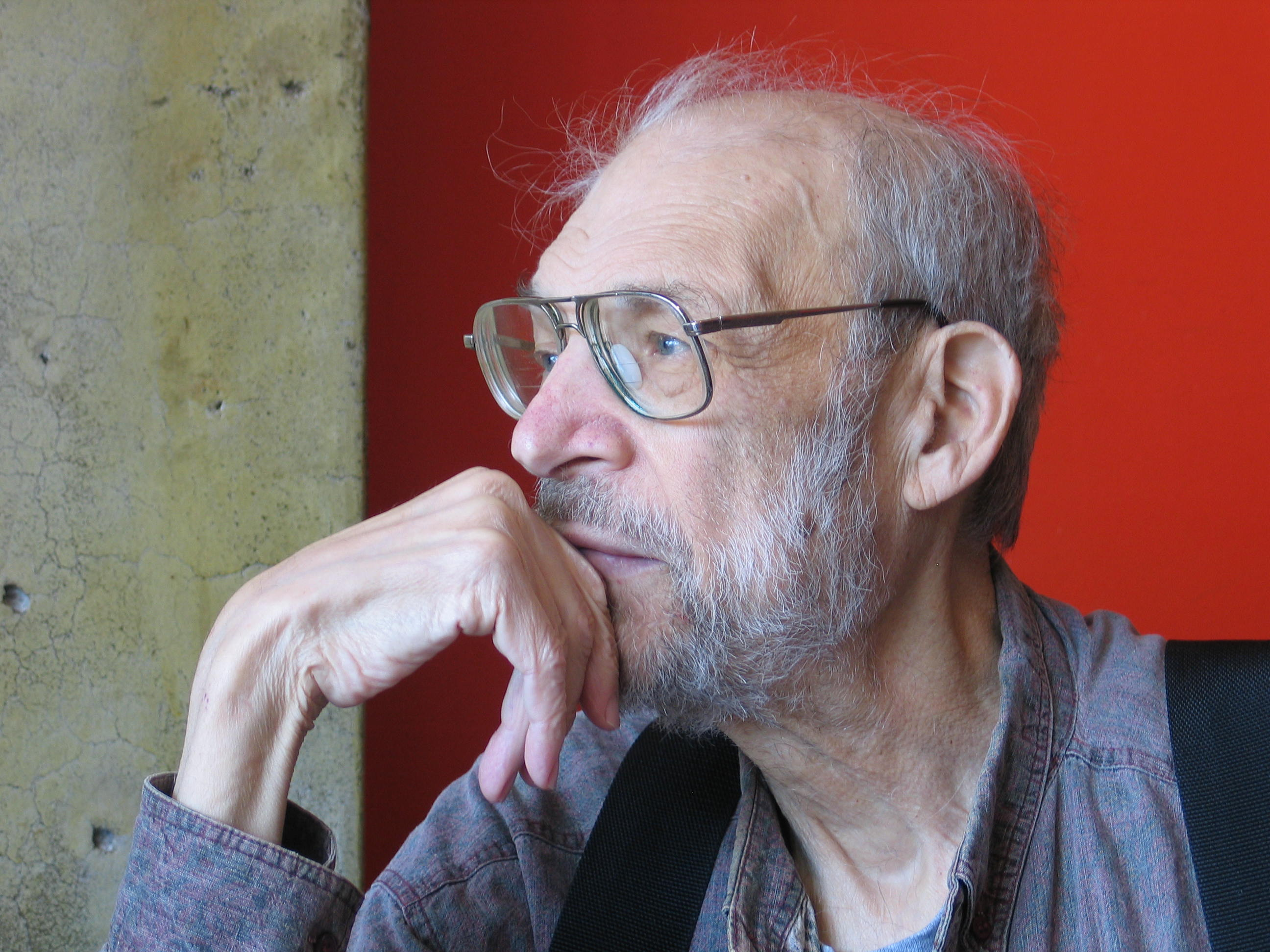
- Born: March 17, 1933; St. Louis, Missouri, U.S.
- Died: October 18, 2008 (aged 75); Los Angeles, California, U.S.
- Education: University of California, Los Angeles (BA); Columbia University (MA, PhD)
- Occupations: Art historian, professor
- Website: http://www.albertboime.com/

Albert Boime (March 17, 1933 – October 18, 2008) was an American art historian and author who was a professor of art history at the University of California, Los Angeles. A professor for three decades, he wrote more than 20 art history books.

== Early life ==
Albert Isaac Boime was born on March 17, 1933, in St. Louis, Missouri. His mother, Dorothy Rubin, was a European Jewish immigrant and his father, Max Boime, was a salesman, and a naval yard worker in Brooklyn during World War II. In 1955, Boime joined the United States Army, stationing in West Germany. Boime went on to earn a bachelor's degree in art history from the University of California at Los Angeles in 1961 after completing service. He followed up in the field with a master's and a doctorate from Columbia University in 1963 and 1968 respectively. During his studies, he was greatly influenced by his brother Jerome Boime (1934–1977), then in Chicago. Through his brother, he met and married Myra Block, a teacher and socialist activist in 1964. He was a professor at the State University of New York at Stony Brook from 1968 until 1972. He then taught and chaired the art department at the Binghamton University, remaining there until 1978. He joined the faculty of UCLA in 1979.

== Writings ==
Boime wrote more than 20 books of art history, focusing not only on style and form but also using a psychoanalytic examination of the social and political contexts of art, examining how artworks are representations of the class, economic, power, and social structures and racial attitudes that exist during their creation.

His first book, The Academy and French Painting in the Nineteenth Century, published in 1971 by Phaidon Press, examined the unintended role of the conservative Académie des Beaux-Arts in the development of 19th-century painters. In 1974, art critic and commentator Hilton Kramer of The New York Times called the book "the indispensable text" for a reconsideration of the merits of the Salon painters, as the book demonstrated the web of connections in the cultural and institutions of the time that affected artistic tastes and aspirations of that time.

His book series, The Social History of Modern Art, analyzed French art from the mid-18th century to the end of the 19th century, making connections between the art and subject matter to historical events at the time, such as the French Revolution and the rule of Napoleon Bonaparte. The four-volume, 3,000-page series, published over a two-decade period by the University of Chicago Press, includes Art in an Age of Revolution, 1750–1800 (1987); Art in an Age of Bonapartism, 1800–1815 (1990); Art in an Age of Counterrevolution, 1815–1848 (2004); and Art in an Age of Civil Struggle, 1848–1871 (2007).

=== The Starry Night painting ===
In an analysis of Vincent van Gogh's The Starry Night, Boime convinced art historians that the images in the painting's night sky were not a fanciful artwork but were the result of Van Gogh's observations of the sky from the window of the asylum in Saint-Rémy-de-Provence at 4 a.m. on June 19, 1889, the day he wrote his brother that he had completed the painting. In a 1985 lecture to the American Astronomical Society, Boime compared the positions of the moon and Venus that night and showed that they corresponded to the positions of the celestial objects in the painting, noting that the scene "tallies with astronomical facts at the time the painting was executed."

=== Articles about contemporary American artists ===
In "Which Came First: The Cosmos Or The Chaos?", which Boime wrote for COSMOS & CHAOS: A Cultural Paradox group exhibition, he included works by Ib Benoh, James Bohary, Eric Fischl, Lucian Freud, and Jerome Witkin. Boime examined the complex of psychological, social, and political issues that some artists face in today's society.

=== The Birth of Abstract Romanticism: Art for the New Humanity: Rumi and the Paintings of Kamran Khavarani ===
In his last publication, Boime details his encounter with the artist, Kamran Khavarani, and his paintings. The book goes through the life of Kamran Khavarani: his inspiration from the Persian poet Rumi, his painting methods, and discusses the new type of art that Khavarani has created which he calls “Abstract Romanticism.” In a letter from 2008, Boime writes:

After 40 years of teaching and writing numerous art history books and articles, it is my last book, "The Birth of Abstract Romanticism," that has truly been the culmination of my career. For anyone familiar with my work, you will notice that this book is a radical departure from my previous writings. For once, just this once, I've written a book about a relatively unknown artist and a brand new art style – Abstract Romanticism – that can influence the history of art. Certainly, his work goes against the grain of most international contemporary art. In fact, he purports to offer an alternative to it. This constitutes a wonderful change that offsets the "ugliness" of so much bacchanalian and barbaric display that presently passes for art. It is my sincere wishes that his body of work may lead you into true beauty of visual art and uplift your spirit as it has mine.

== Death ==
A longtime resident of Los Angeles, Boime died at the age of 75 in his home there on October 18, 2008, of the bone marrow disorder myelofibrosis.

== Selected honors and awards ==
- A. Kingsley Porter Prize (1971) for his article in Art Bulletin, "The Second Republic's Contest for the Figure of the Republic."
- Guggenheim fellowship (1974, 1984)
- American Academy in Rome fellowship (1979)
- Gustavus Myers Center Outstanding Book Award (1999) for The Unveiling of the National Icons: A Plea for Patriotic Iconoclasm in a Nationalist Era

== Publications ==
=== Selected books ===
- The Birth of Abstract Romanticism: Art for a New Humanity: Rumi and the Paintings of Kamran Khavarani (2008), Sybil City Book Company. ISBN 978-0981673905
- Revelation of modernism Responses to Cultural Crises in Fin-de-Siècle Painting (2008), University of Missouri Press. ISBN 978-0826217806
- Art in the Age of Civil Struggle, 1848–1871 (2008), University of Chicago Press. ISBN 978-0226063287
- Art in an Age of Counterrevolution, 1815–1848 (2004), University of Chicago Press. ISBN 978-0226063379
- The Unveiling of the National Icons a Plea for Patriotic Iconoclasm in a Nationalist Era (1998), Cambridge University Press. ISBN 978-0521570671
- Violence and Utopia the Work of Jerome P. Boime (1996), University Press of America. ISBN 978-0761803249
- Art and the French Commune Imagining Paris after War and Revolution (1995), Princeton University Press. ISBN 978-0691015552
- The Odyssey of Jan Stussy in Black and White: Anxious Visions and Uncharted Dreams (1995), Jan Stussy Foundation.
- The Art of the Macchia and the Risorgimento Representing Culture and Nationalism in 19th-Century Italy (1993), University of Chicago Press. ISBN 978-0226063300
- The Art of Exclusion Representing Black People in the 19th-Century (1990), Smithsonian Institution Press. ISBN 978-0874742572
- Art in the Age of Bonapartism: 1800–1815 (1990), University of Chicago Press. ISBN 978-0226063355
- Hollow Icons the Politics of Sculpture in Nineteenth Century France (1987), Kent State University Press. ISBN 978-0873383462
- Art in the Age of Revolution, 1750–1800 (1987), University of Chicago Press. ISBN 978-0226063348
- Thomas Couture and the Eclectic Vision (1980), Yale University Press. ISBN 978-0300021585
- The Academy and French Painting in the Nineteenth Century (1971), Phaidon Press Ltd. ISBN 978-0300037326

=== Selected articles ===
- "Le Musee des copies", Gazette des Beaux-Arts, October 1964
- "Seurat and Piero della Francesca," Art Bulletin, June 1965
- "A Source for Van Gogh's Potato-Eaters," Gazette des Beaux-Arts, October 1966
- "Roy Lichtenstein and the Comic Strip," Art Journal, Winter 1968
- "Monkey Drawings by Seurat and Pisanello, Burlington Magazine, February 1969
- "Thomas Couture and the Evolution of Nineteenth-Century French Painting," Art Bulletin, March 1969
- "Did Girodet Sign Somebody Else's Work?" Gazette des Beaux-Arts, October 1969
- "Georges Rouault and the Academic Curriculum, Art Journal, Fall 1969
- "Stony Brook Architecture: A Promising Future After a Dull Beginning," Stony Brook Union, April 1970
- "Notes on Daubigny's Early Chronology," Art Bulletin, June 1970
- "A Visit to Mondrianland," Arts Magazine, June 1970
- "The Salon des Refuses and the Evolution of Modern Art," The Art Quarterly, Spring 1970
- "George Sauter's Bridal Morning," American Art Journal, November 1970
- "Shica Greenberg and Jewish Art," Dimensions in American Judaism, September 1970
- "Picasso's Night Fishing at Antibes: One More Try," Journal of Aesthetics, Winter 1970
- "An Unpublished Petition Exemplifying the Oneness of the Community of Nineteenth-Century French Artists," Journal of the Warburg and Courtauld Institutes, 1970
- "The Second Republic's Contest for the Figure of the Republic," Art Bulletin, March 1971
- "Jean-Leon Gerome, Henry Rousseau's Sleeping Gypsy and the Academic Legacy," The Art Quarterly, Spring 1971
- "Cosmic Artifacts: Works in Lucite by Ron Lusker," Art Journal, Winter 1971–1972
- "Thomas Nast and French Art," American Art Journal, May 1972
- "Ingress et Egress chez Ingres," Gazette des Beaux-Arts, April 1973
- "New Light on Manet's Execution of Maximilian," The Art Quarterly, Fall 1973
- "Ryder and Newman," Art News, January 1974
- "We Don't Want to Set the World on Fire, We just Want to Start a Flame in Your Heart," in Catalogue, Art Pompier: Anti-Impressionism, Hofstra University, October 1974
- "Strictly Academic: Life Drawing in the Nineteenth Century," Catalogue essay, Binghamton, 1974
- "Charles Gleyre and the Evolution of 19th-Century Painting," in Charles Gleyre, Catalogue essay, Lausanne, Switzerland, 1974
- "Sources for Millais's Christ in the House of His Parents," Gazette des Beaux-Arts, May 1975
- "Entrepreneurial Patronage in Nineteenth-Century France," in Enterprise and Entrepreneurs in 19th and 20th Century France, the Johns Hopkins University Press, Baltimore and London, 1976
- "The Teaching Reforms of 1863 and the Origins of Modernism in France," Art Quarterly, Autumn 1977
- "Don DeMauro and the Struggle Against the Artist's Mystique," Catalogue essay, Binghamton, 1977
- "The Image of the Drummer Boy in Nineteenth-Century Painting," Bulletin of the Detroit Institute of the Arts, January 1978
- "There is Some Accounting for Taste," Burlington Magazine, September 1978
- "Les hommes d'affaires et les arts in France au 19eme siecle," Actes de la recherche, June 1979 (French adaptation of preceding article)
- "The Second Empire Exhibition," Histoire et critique des arts, No. 11–12, 1979
- "Marmontel's Belisarius and David's Pre-Revolutionary Progressivism," Art History, March 1980
- "The Enrollment of the Volunteers and the Revolution of 1848," in Thomas Couture and the Painting of History, catalogue Museum of Art, Springfield, 1980
- "Ford Madox Brown Carlyle, and Karl Marx: Meaning and Mystification of Work in the Nineteenth Century," Arts Magazine, September 1981
- "Newman, Ryder, Couture and Hero-Worship in Art History," The American Art Journal, November 1981
- "The Case of Rosa Bonheur: Why should a Woman be more like a man?" Art History, December 1981
- "Les magnats americains a la conquete de l'art francais," L'histoire, April 1982
- "American culture and the revival of the French Academic Tradition," Arts Magazine, May 1982
- "The Unhappy Medium: An Exchange," The New York Review of Books, October 21, 1982
- "The Teaching of Fine Arts and the Avant-Garde in France during the second half of the Nineteenth-Century," VII Colloquium of the Instituto de Investigaciones Esteticas, 1982
- "The Second Empire's Official Realism", in The European Realist Tradition, Bloomington, Indiana, 1982
- "Lawrence Fane: The Sculpture in Pursuit of his Quarry," Catalogue essay for Marilyn Pearl Gallery, 1982
- "Gerome and the Bourgeois Artist's Burden," Arts Magazine, January 1983
- "Oller and 19th-Century Puerto Rican Nationalism," in Francisco Oller, A Realist-Impressionist, Museo de Art, Ponce, 1983
- "The Prix de Rome: Images of Authority and threshold of Official Success," Art Journal, Vol. 44, Fall 1984
- "Van Gogh's Starry Night: A History of Matter and a Matter of History, Arts Magazine, December 1984
- "Declassicizing the Academic: A Realist View of Ingres," Art History, March 1985
- "The Quasi-Open Contests of the Quasi-Legitimate July Monarchy," Arts Magazine, March 1985
- "Francisco Oller and the Image of Black People in the Nineteenth Century," Horizontes: Revista de la Universidad Catolica de Puerto Rico, Ponce, P.R., vol. 28, April 1985
- "William Blake and the Industrial Revolution," Art Magazine, June 1985
- "The Teaching of Fine Arts and the Avant-Garde in France during the Second Half of the Nineteenth Century," Arts Magazine, December 1985
- "Liberty: Inside Story of a Hollow Symbol," In These Times, June 11–24, 1986
- "Caspar David Friedrich: The Monk at the Seaside," Arts Magazine, November 1986
- "Painted Pomp: Setting the World on Fire," FMR, December 1986
- "The Macchiaioli and The Risorgimento," essay for catalogue, Frederick S. Wight Art Gallery, University of California, Los Angeles, 1986 (Italian translation "I Macchiaioli e l'America," Italian Congress, 1992
- "Sargent in Paris and London: Portrait of the Artist as Dorian Gray," essay for catalogue John Singer Sargent, Whitney Museum of American Art, 1986
- "La Statue de la Liberte: une icone vide," le debat, March–May 1987 ("Ein alterer Schlauch. Zur Geschichte der Freiheits-statue," Freibeuter 38, 1989 - German adaptation of above work)
- "Political Signification and Ambiguity in the Oil Sketch," Arts Magazine, September 1987
- "The Macchiaioli: Art and History," Arts Magazine, January 1988
- "Jacques-Louis David, Scatalogical Discourse in the French Revolution, and The Art of Caricature," Arts Magazine, February 1988 (Reprinted in Catalogue French Caricature and the French Revolution,1789–1799, edited by James Cuno, UCLA, 1988
- "Burgoo and Bourgeois: Thomas Noble's Images of Black People," essay for catalogue on Thomas Noble, University of Kentucky Art Museum, April, 1988
- Foreword to Andrew W. Brainerd, The Infanta Adventure and the Lost Manet, Long Beach, Michigan City, Indiana: Reichl Press 1988
- "Blacks in Shark-Infested Water: Visual Encodings of Racism in Copley and Homer," Smithsonian Studies in American Art, Winter 1989
- "Caspar David Friedrich," article for Electa History of European Society, vol. 2, The Age of Revolutions: 1776–1815, 1989
- "Olin Levi Warner's Defense of the Paris Commune," Archives of American Art Journal, 1989
- "The Chocolate Venus, Tainted Pork, Wine Blight the Tariff: Franco-American Soup at the Exposition Universelle of 1889," in Catalogue for Pennsylvania Academy of Fine Arts, Paris 1889: American Artists at the Universal Exposition, published by Henry Abrams, 1989
- "The 1848 Contests for the Symbolic figure of the Republic as a Vent for Domestic and Foreign Reaction, Album Amicorum, Kenneth C. Lindsay, March 1990
- "Seurat and the Scientific Approach to History Painting," Historie und Historienmalerei in der Malerei des 19. und 20. Jahrhunderts, edited by Ekkehard Mai, Munich, March 1990. Translated excerpt, "Seurat: Building a Utopia from a City in Ashes," The Journal of Art, November 1991
- "The Responses of Two Prussian Painters to the Revolutions of 1848," Art History, March 1990
- "Waving the Red flag and Reconstituting Old Glory", Smithsonian Studies in American Art, Spring 1990
- Preface to Lois Fink, American Artists at the Paris Salons, Cambridge University Press, 1990
- "Turner's Slave-Ship and the Condition of England," Turner Studies, Summer 1990
- "Gericault and Georget: Images of Monomaniacs to Service the Alienist's Monomania," Oxford Art Journal, Spring 1990
- "Patriarchy fixed in Stone," American Art, Winter/Spring, 1991
- "Alfred Rethel's Counterrevolutionary Death Dance," Art Bulletin, December 1991
- "Louis-Leopold Boilly's Reading of the XIth and XIIth Bulletins of the Grande Armee," Zeitschrift für Kunstgeschichte, 1992
- "Leaves of Grass and Real Allegory: A Case Study of International Rebellion," Walt Whitman and the Visual Arts, eds G. M. Sill and R. K. Tarbell, Rutgers University Press, 1992
- "The Sketch and Caricature as Metaphors for the French Revolution," Zeitschrift für Kunstgeschichte, 1992
- "Les Themes du Serment: David et la Franc-Maconnerie," David contre David, Paris, 1993
- "The Postwar Definition of Self: Marisol's Yearbook Illustrations for the Class of '49," American Art, Spring 1993
- "Manet's Bar at the Folies- Bergere as an Allegory of Nostalgia," Zeitschrift für Kunstgeschichte, No. 2, 1993
- The Art of the Macchia and the Risorgimento: Art and Nationalism in Nineteenth-Century Italy, University of Chicago Press, 1993
- "Henry Ossawa Tanner's Subversion of Genre," Art Bulletin, September 1993
- "Going to Extremes over the Juste Milieu," in The Popularization of Images Visual Culture under the July Monarchy, Princeton University Press, 1994
- "Ryder on a Gilded Horse," Zeitschrift für Kunstgeschichte, 1994
- "The Americanization of El Greco" (for International Symposium celebrating 450th Anniversary of the painter on Crete, El Greco in Crete, 1995
- "Perestroika and the Toppling of the Statues," Totalitarianisms and Traditions, 1995
- "Van Gogh and Thomas Nast," in Hofstra University publication of Van Gogh symposium, 1996

=== Reviews ===
- "Academic Yes, Decadent No," The New York Times, September 29, 1969
- "A Landscapist for all Seasons and Dr. Jekyll and Martin Heade," Burlington Magazine, May 1970
- "A la Mode and Haute Couture," Burlington Magazine, May 1970
- "The Uncrowned Touches of Thomas Couture," Thomas Couture: Drawings and Some Oil Sketches. May–June 1971, Shepherd Gallery
- "Le Deroulement des Enroles," Preface Thomas Couture exhibition, Beauvais, France, May 1971
- "The Comic Stripped and Ash Canned," review of the Catalogue The Art of the Comic Strip, Art Journal, Spring 1973
- Review of Hugh Honour's The Image of the Black in Western Art, vol. IV, The New York Times Book Review, February 1989
- "Vincent and Theo: a Tale of Two Brothers," Zeitschrift für Kunstgeschichte, 1994
