= Kamran Khavarani =

Iranian-American architect and painter (born 1941)

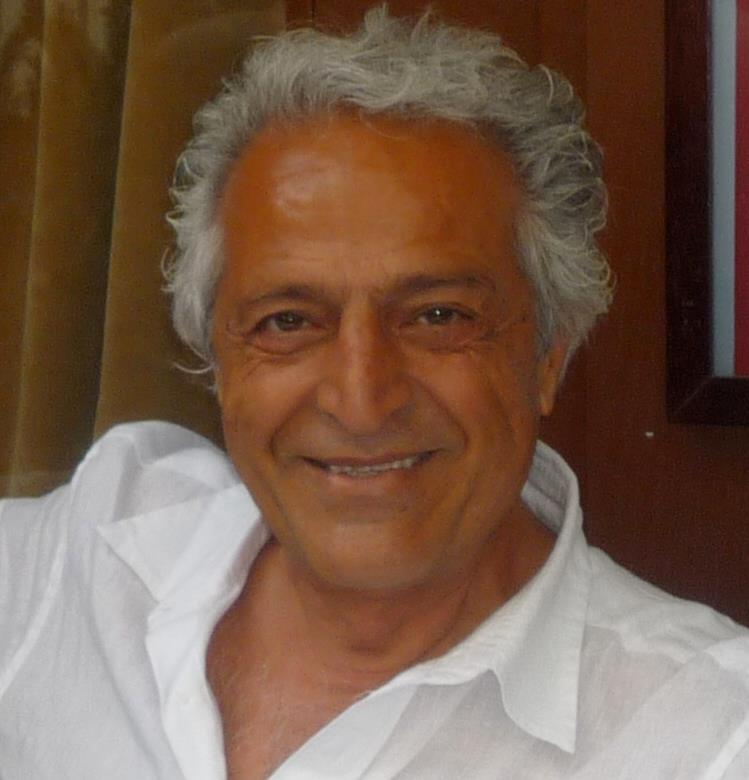
- Born: 1941 (age 84–85); Tehran, Iran
- Occupations: Painter, Architect
- Known for: Abstract Romanticism
- Website: http://khavarani.com/life.cfm http://khavarani.com/About.cfm

Kamran Khavarani (born 1941) is an Iranian-American architect and painter. He has won multiple awards for his residential and commercial designs and a painter trained in the classical style. What may be his most notable achievement is the creation of a new style of painting called Abstract Romanticism, accredited to him by art historian Albert Boime of UCLA in 2005. His paintings have gained recognition from the Library of Congress and have been researched for their therapeutic effects.

== Biography ==
Kamran Khavarani was born in 1941, in Tehran, Iran. He started painting at the age of 12. Khavarani was trained in classical painting by Reza Samimi. In 1966, he graduated from The University of Tehran having completed a Master's in Architecture and a PhD in Urban Design. Khavarani started his career as an architect. In 1965, his conceptual design for the City Theater of Tehran was selected by an international jury. Khavarani moved to the United States in 1981.

After he took residency in Los Angeles, California he had to start his architectural career all over. His first project in the States was in Beverly Hills. After the completion of that project in 1984, Khavarani won the CALBO Award of Excellence in the single-family category. He later designed the World Trade Bank of Beverly Hills, for which he won a design award from the City of Beverly Hills Architectural Commission.

Khavarani took painting more seriously after arriving in the States. In the 1990s, he started studying philosophy and found inspiration in the works of the Persian poet Rumi. Khavarani's painting style was discovered by the late Professor Albert Boime, a Social Art Historian from UCLA. Boime wrote The Birth of Abstract Romanticism, Art for a New Humanity, Rumi and the Paintings of Kamran Khavarani, dedicating the entire volume to the works of Kamran Khavarani. Professor Albert Boime credited Khavarani for the creation of an artistic movement through his new style of painting, "Abstract Romanticism," and called it a "one-person movement"

In 2010, Khavarani's drawing, titled "The Bird of Freedom" was presented by Nowruz Commission to the spirit of Thomas Jefferson and accepted into the Library of Congress by James Hadley Billington. This presentation was officially noted in the Congressional Records and became part of the United States history. In 2011, the National Ethnic Coalition of Organizations awarded Khavarani the Ellis Island Medal of Honor in recognition of his contributions to America.

In 2013, the potential therapeutic effect of his artwork was undergoing academic research.

== Style and Technique ==
Khavarani is trained in classical painting, his early works were painted in this style. His works also include ink sketches and lifelike portraits In more recent years, his paintings are inspired by the Persian poet Jalal ad-Din Rumi. Rumi emphasizes the freedom of and individuality of creation obtained through love and joy and the fluidity of reinventing itself, but to viewers these connections are indistinguishable. Yet, his paintings hold the capacity to endow a heightened state of mind associated with the themes of Rumi. Common motifs of his paintings include plants: such as flowers and trees, the four elements: earth, wind, water and fire, and he uses the theme of creation or Genesis. This new style of painting is in the genre of "Abstract Romanticism", described by Albert Boime as: "The debut of a new art form, bringing emotion and beauty into the here and now. A dreaming for and of transcendence: an art for a new humanity".

Khavarani mainly paints with his hands and wears gloves to protect his skin.

== Selected Awards and Recognition ==
- 1984: California Building Official's Award of Excellence in the category of single family design.
- 1986: City of Beverly Hills Architectural Commission's architectural design award for the design of the World Trade Bank.
- 2010: The US Congress recognized Khavarani's drawing, "Birds of Freedom" and installed it in the Library of Congress.
- 2011: National Ethnic Coalition of Organizations (NECO), Ellis Island Medal of Honor.

Khavarani's most recognized achievement is the creation of "Abstract Romanticism". In an open letter to his art historian colleagues, Albert Boime wrote:

After 40 years of teaching and writing numerous art history books and articles, it is my last book "The Birth of Abstract Romanticism" that has truly been the culmination of my career. For anyone familiar with my work, you will notice that this book is radical departure from my previous writings.

For once, just this once, I've written a book about a relatively unknown artist and a brand new art style – Abstract Romanticism – that can influence the history of art.

Certainly his work goes against the grain of most international contemporary art in fact purports to offer an alternative to it. This constitutes a wonderful change that offsets the "ugliness" of so much bacchanalian and barbaric display that presently passes for art.

It is my sincere wishes that his body of work may lead you into true beauty of visual art and uplift your spirit as it has mine.

— Albert Boime, July 28, 2008

== Selected works ==
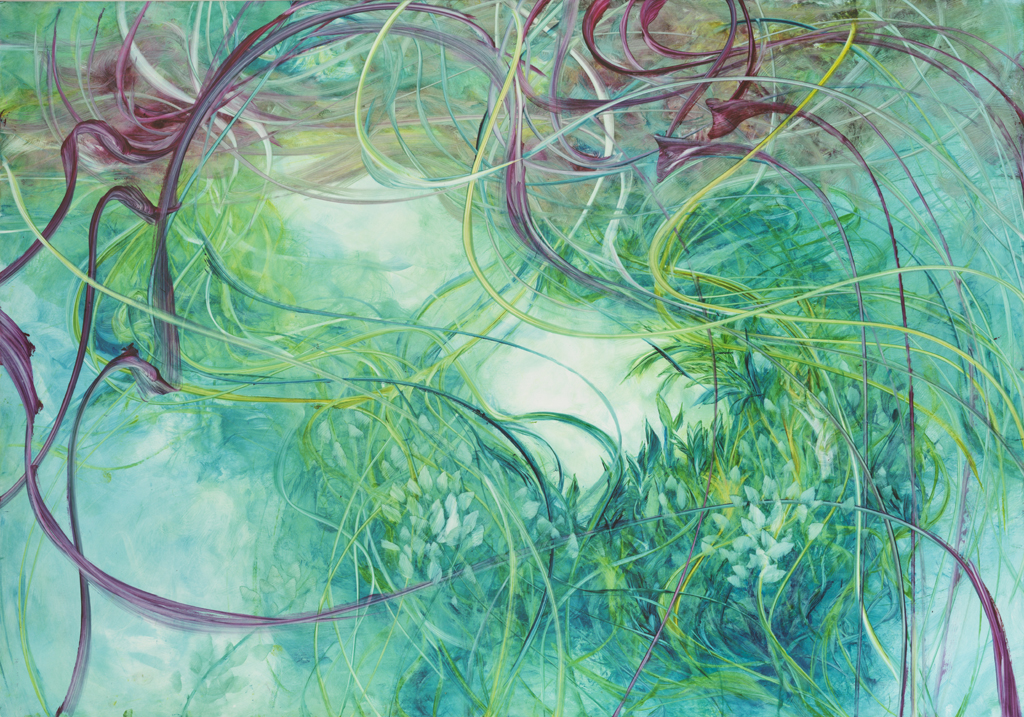
Freedom_043L13WW, 28"x40"

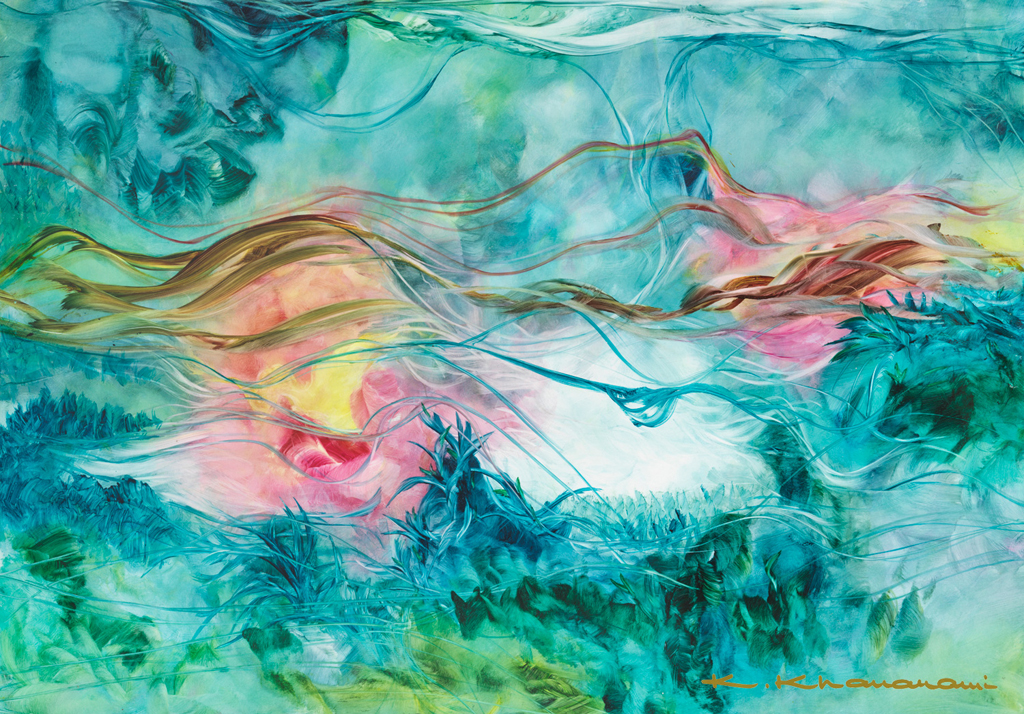
In the Beginning_034L13WW, 28"x40"

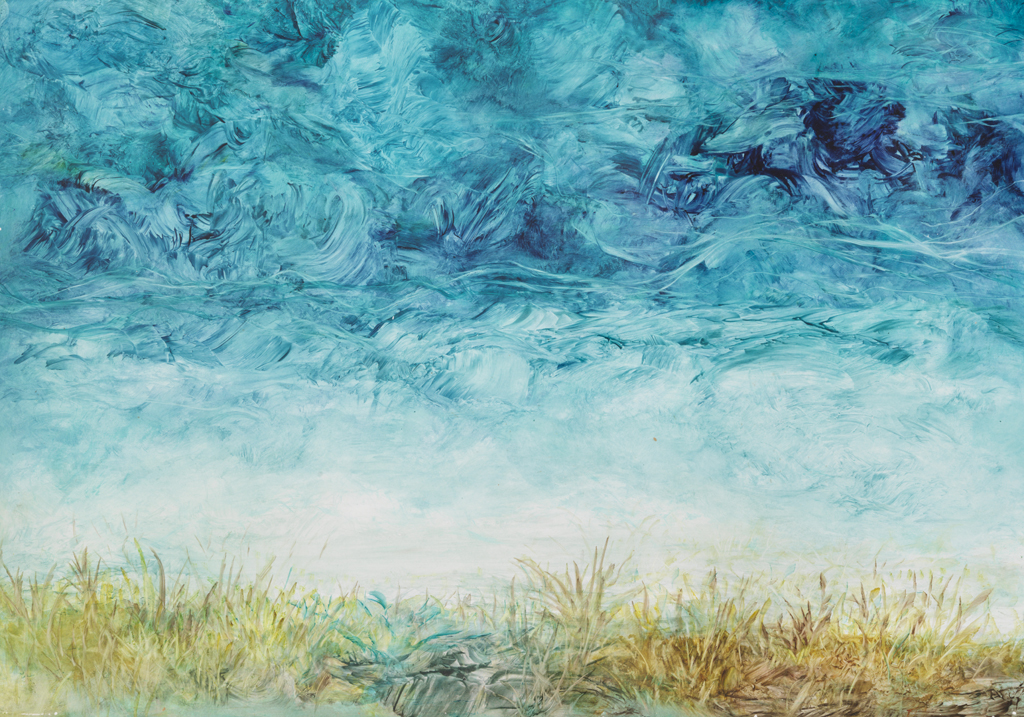
As Above so Bellow_033L11NG, 28"x40"

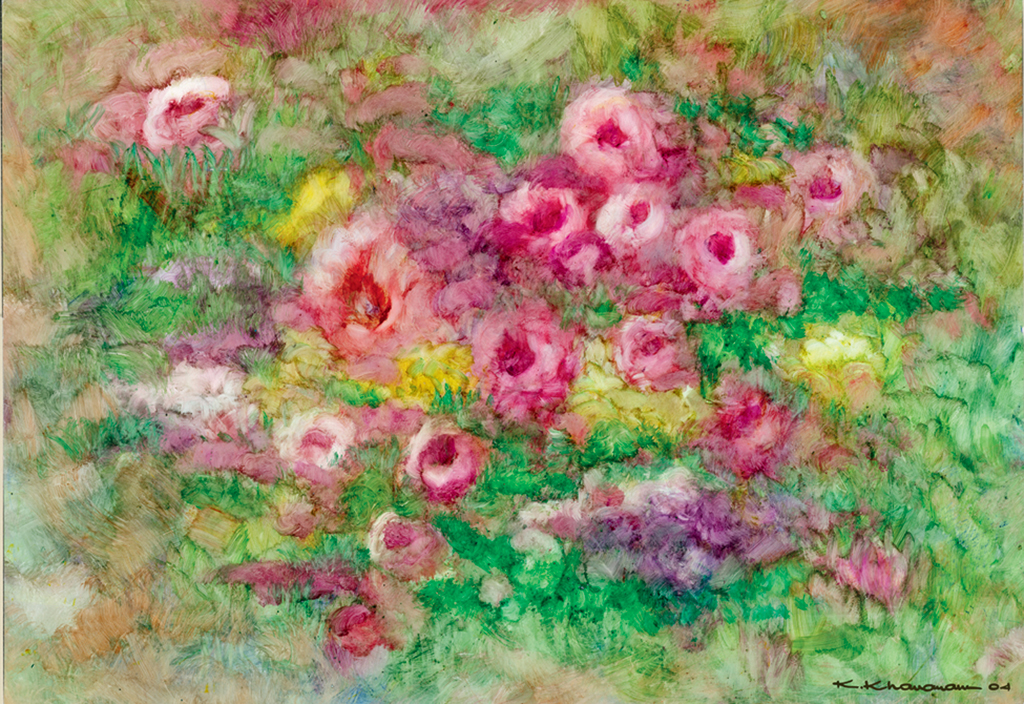
Tapestry with Pink Flowers_041L04EN, 28"x40"

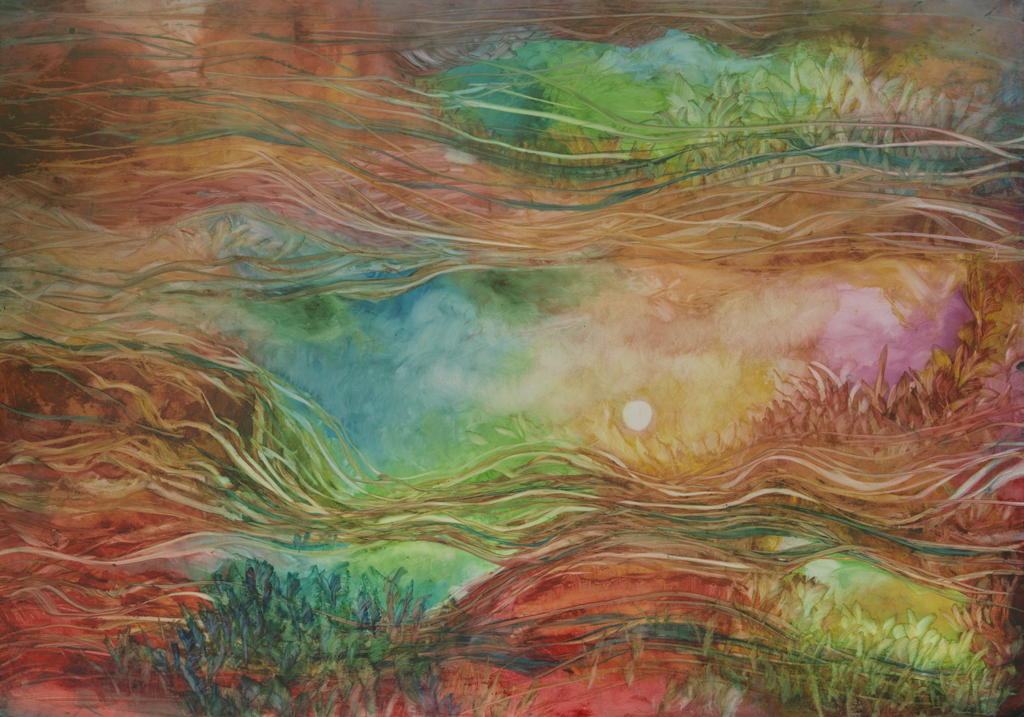
Dawn's Breeze_023L04EN, 28"x40"

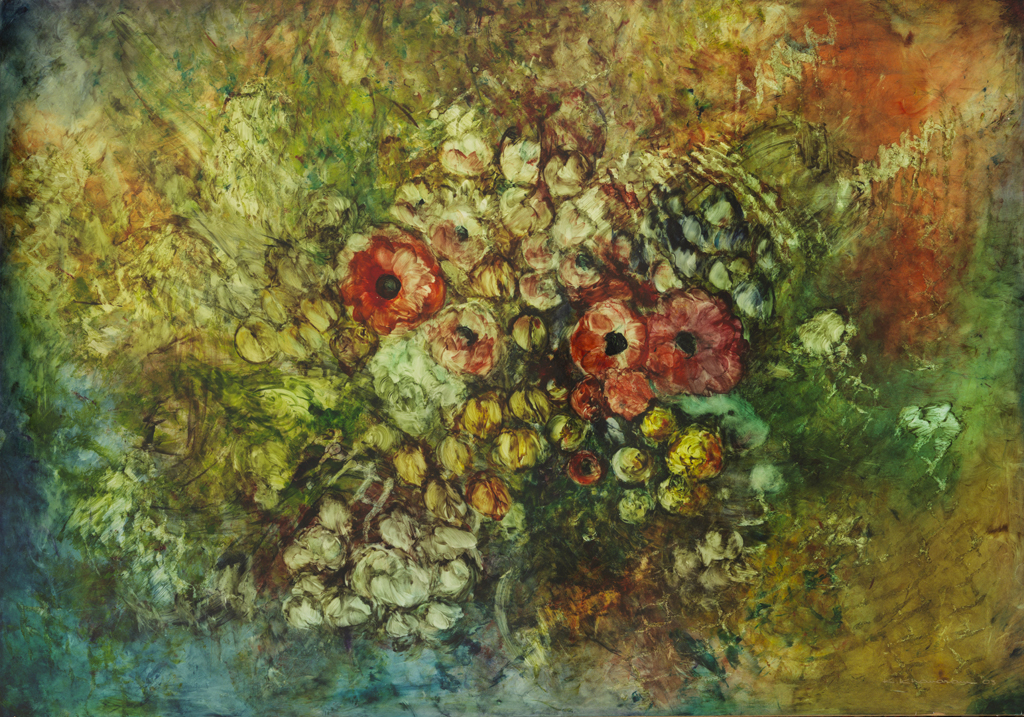
Color of Love_030L03EN, 28"x40"

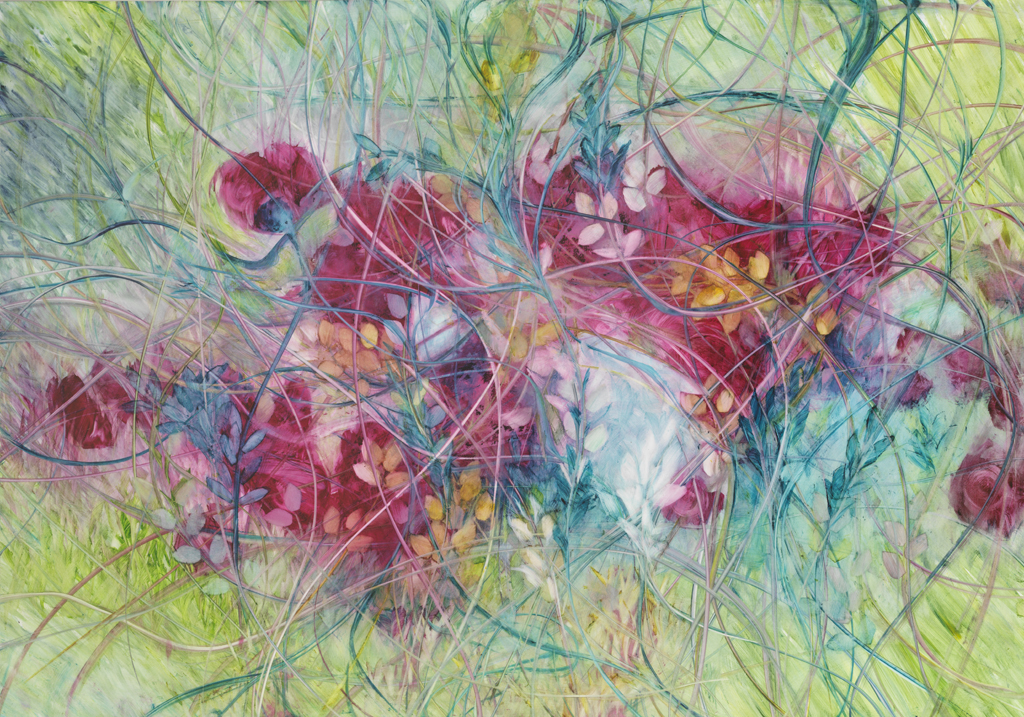
Freedom_039L13WW, 28"x40"

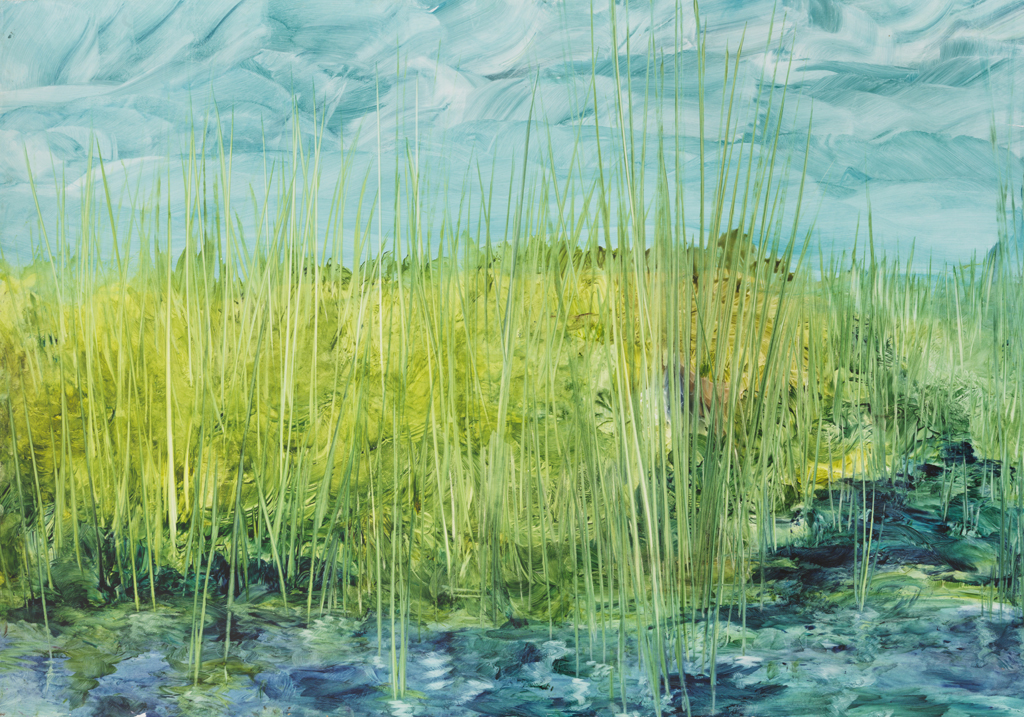
Ascension_066L13WW, 28"x40"

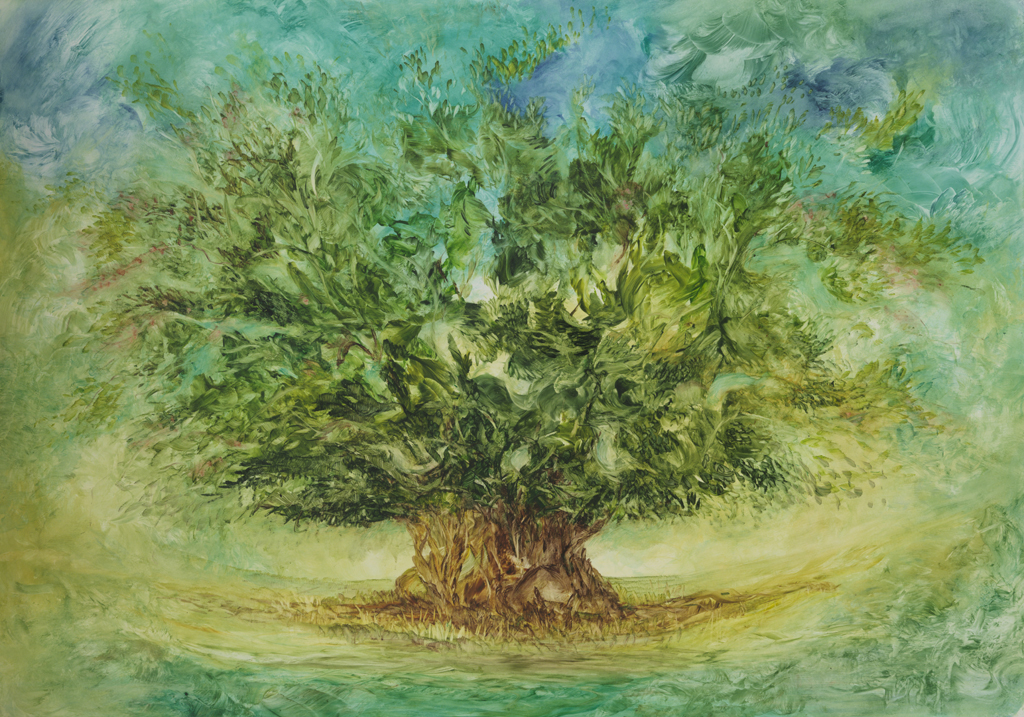
Tree of Life_024L05NG, 28"x40"

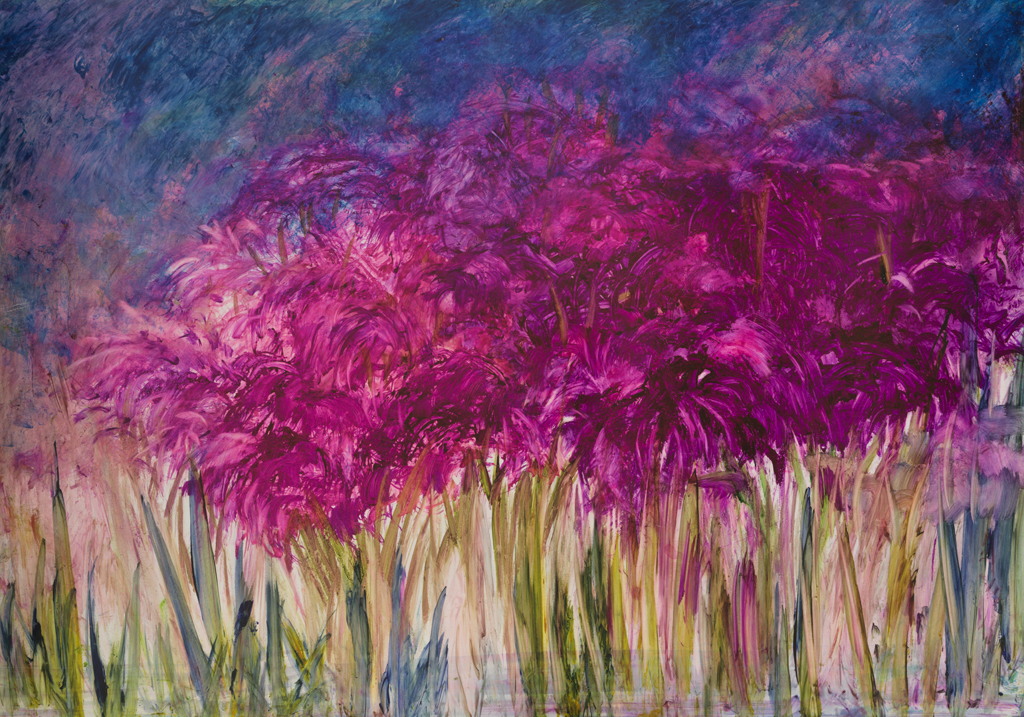
Order_028L04EN, 28"x40"

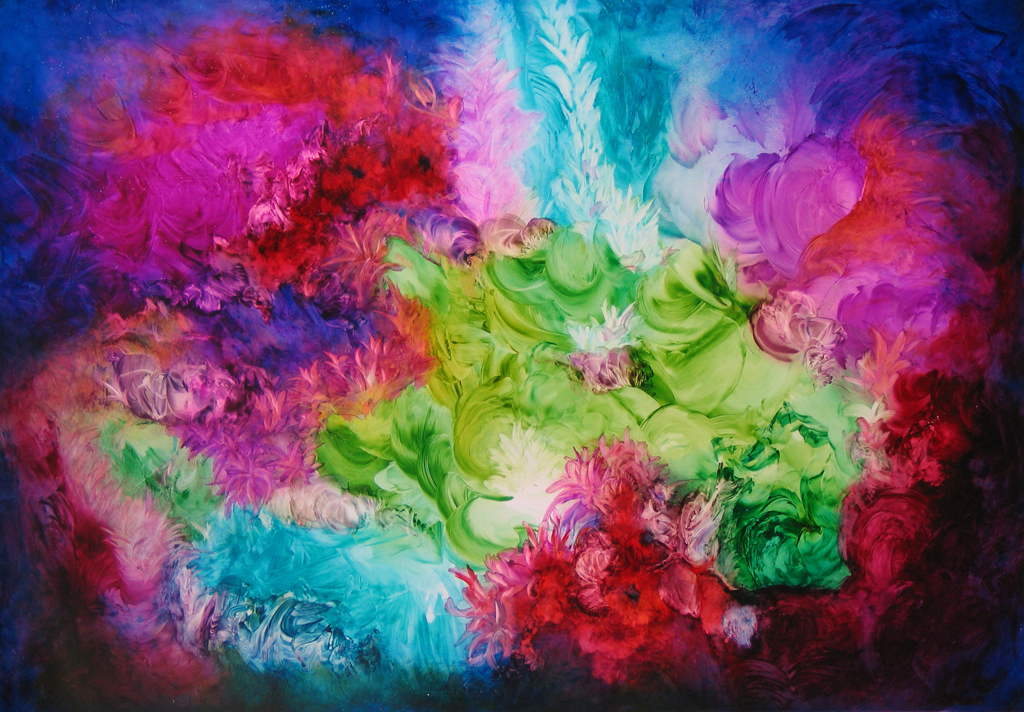
Oceanic Heaven_045L04EN, 28"x40"

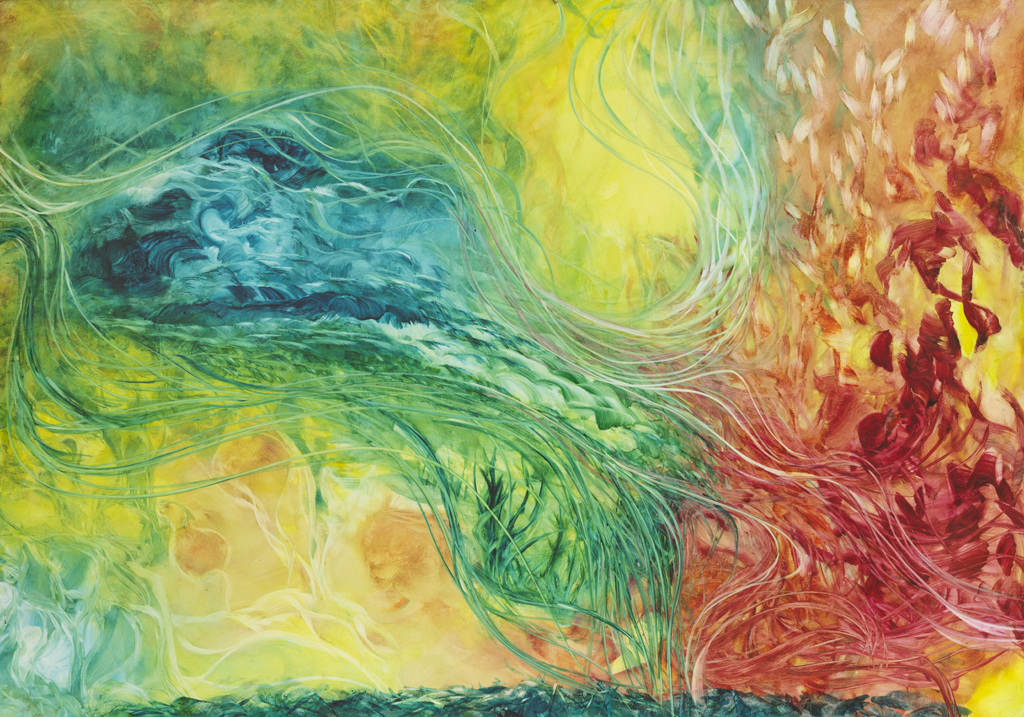
Creation_048L13WW, 28"x40"

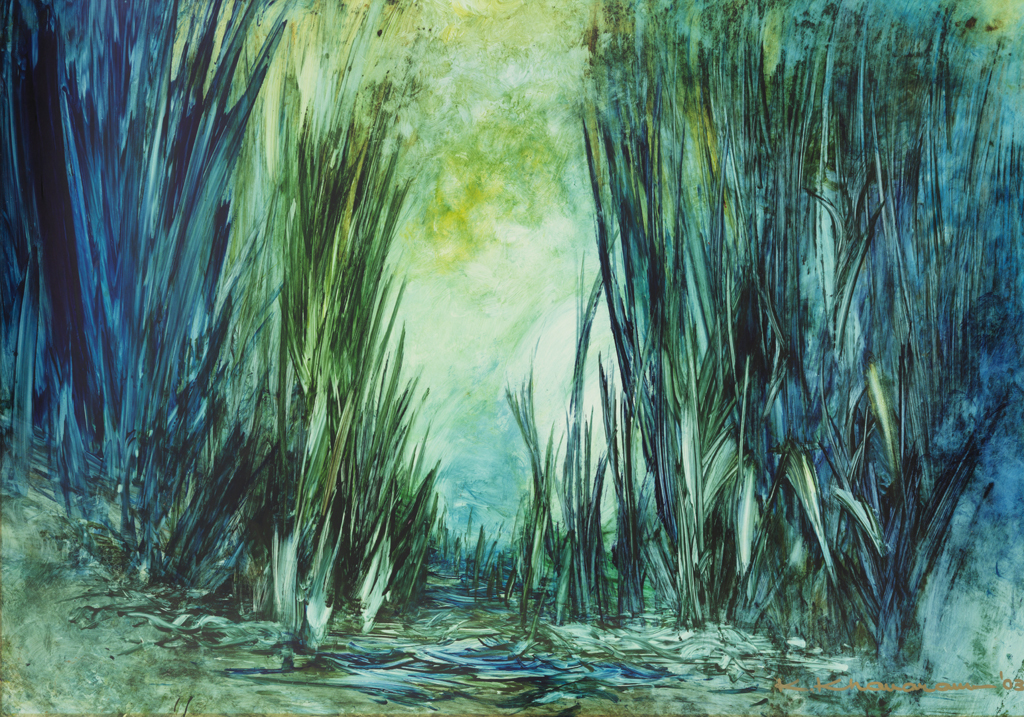
The Way_021L03EN, 28"x40"

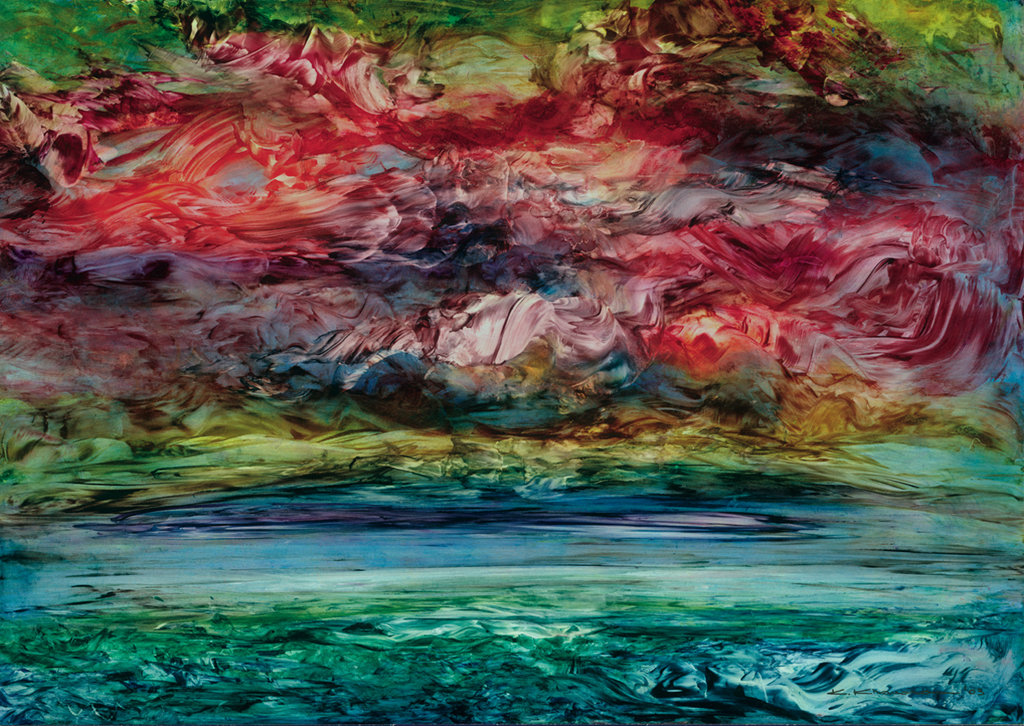
Creation_024L03EN, 28"x40"

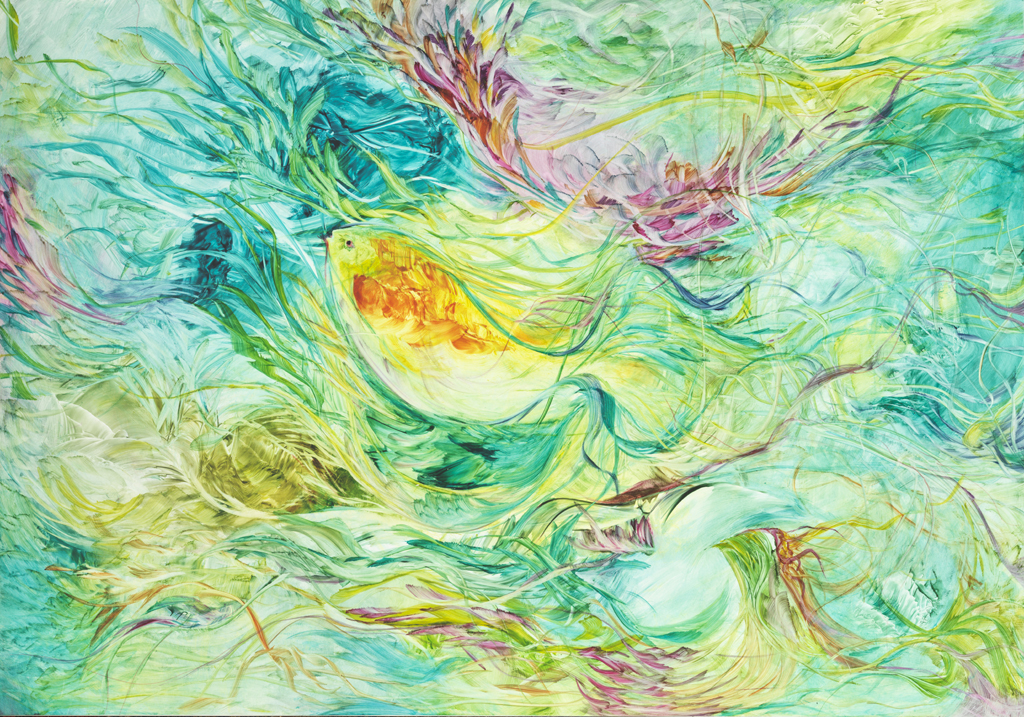
Fluidity_024L11NG, 28"x40"

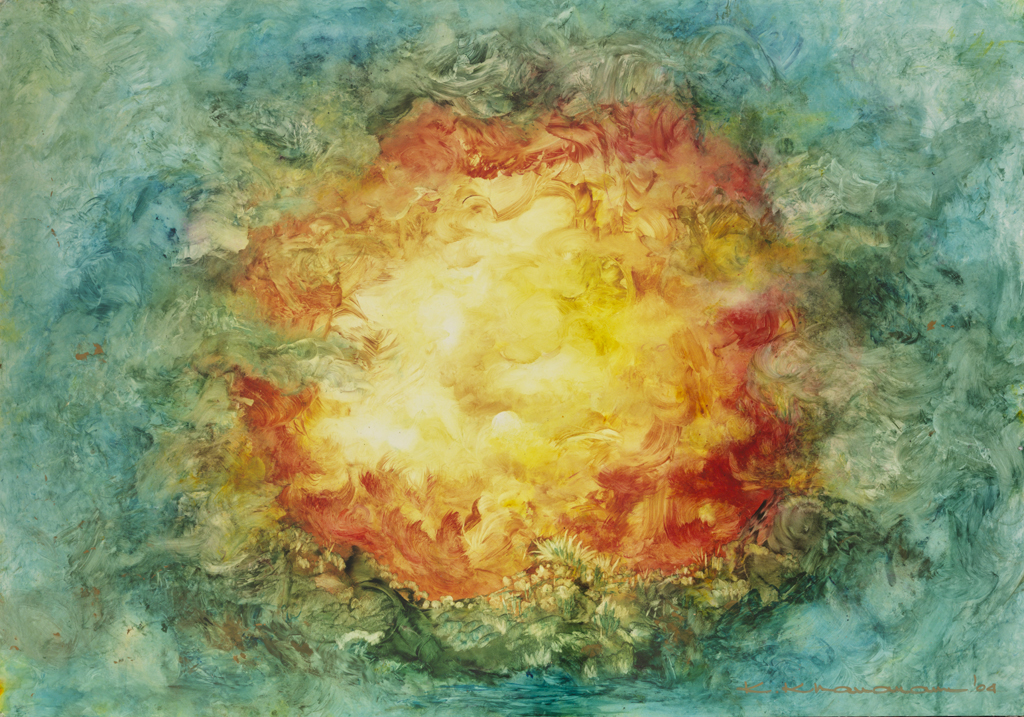
Mithra_027L04EN, 28"x40"

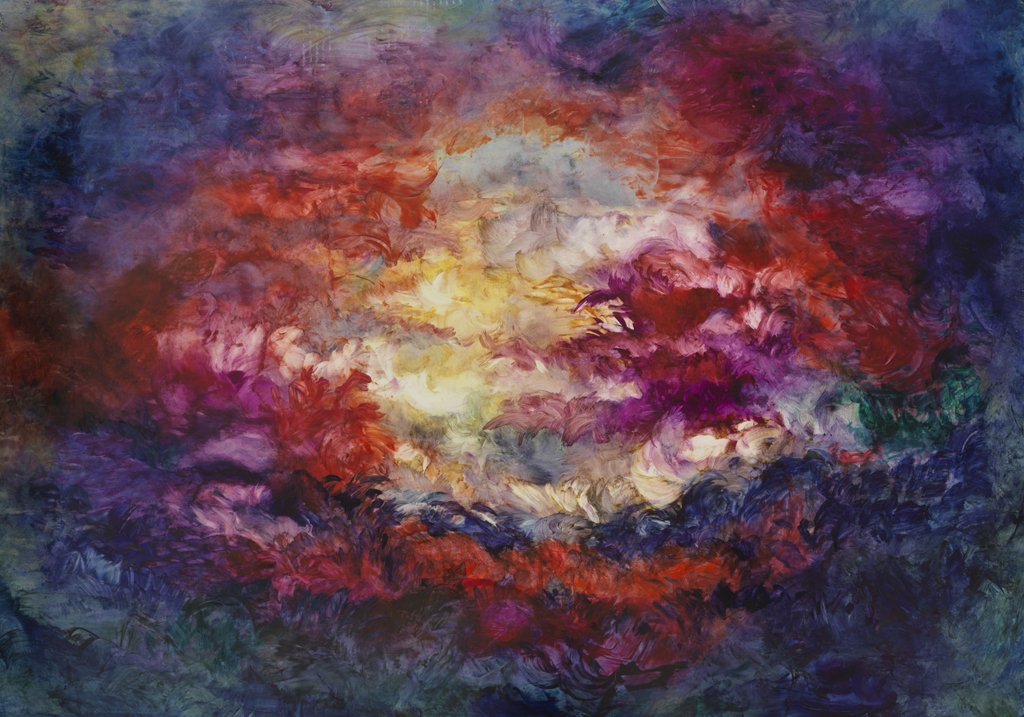
Love at the Beginning_026L04EN, 28"x40"

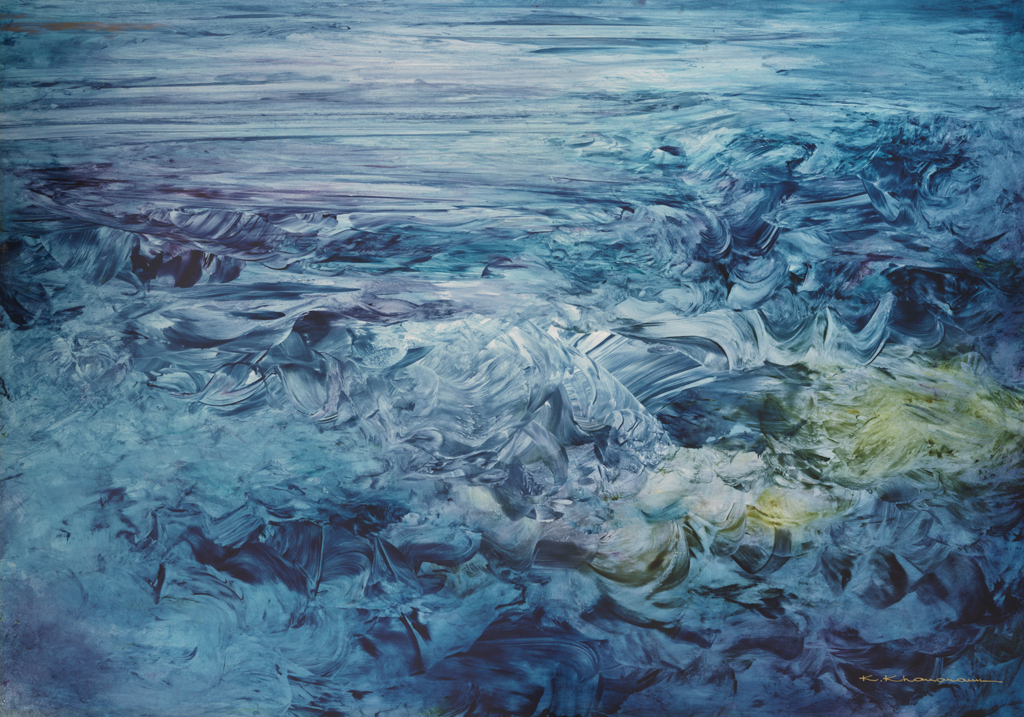
Am I a Drop or the Ocean?_025L03EN, 28"x40"

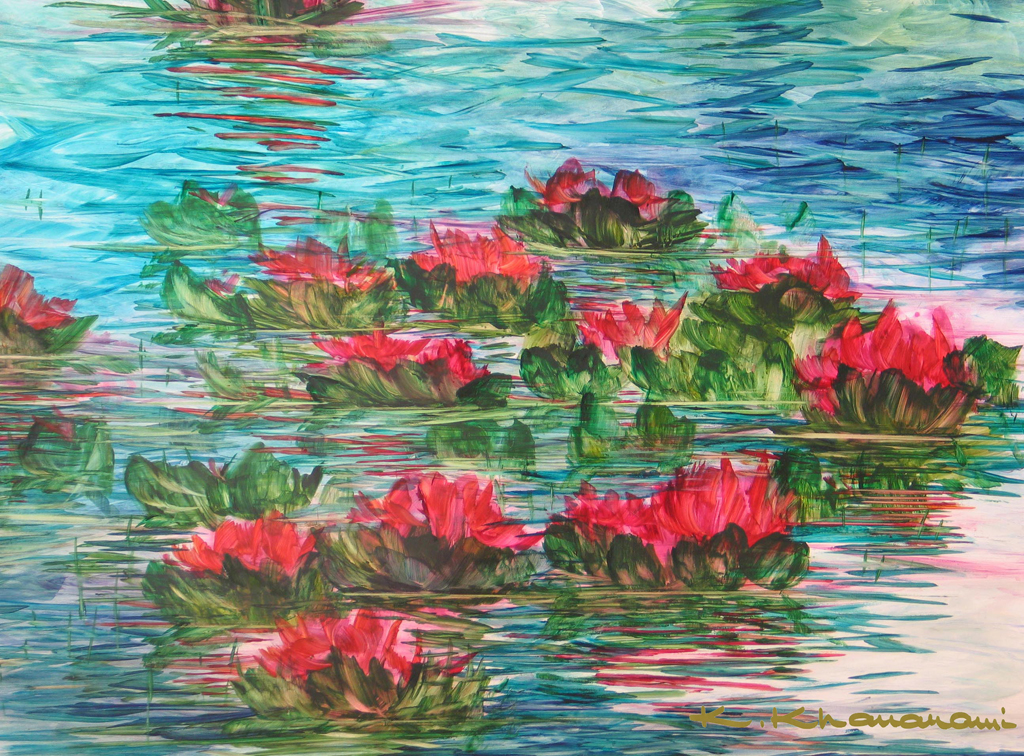
Lilies in Love_018L06EN, 28"x40"

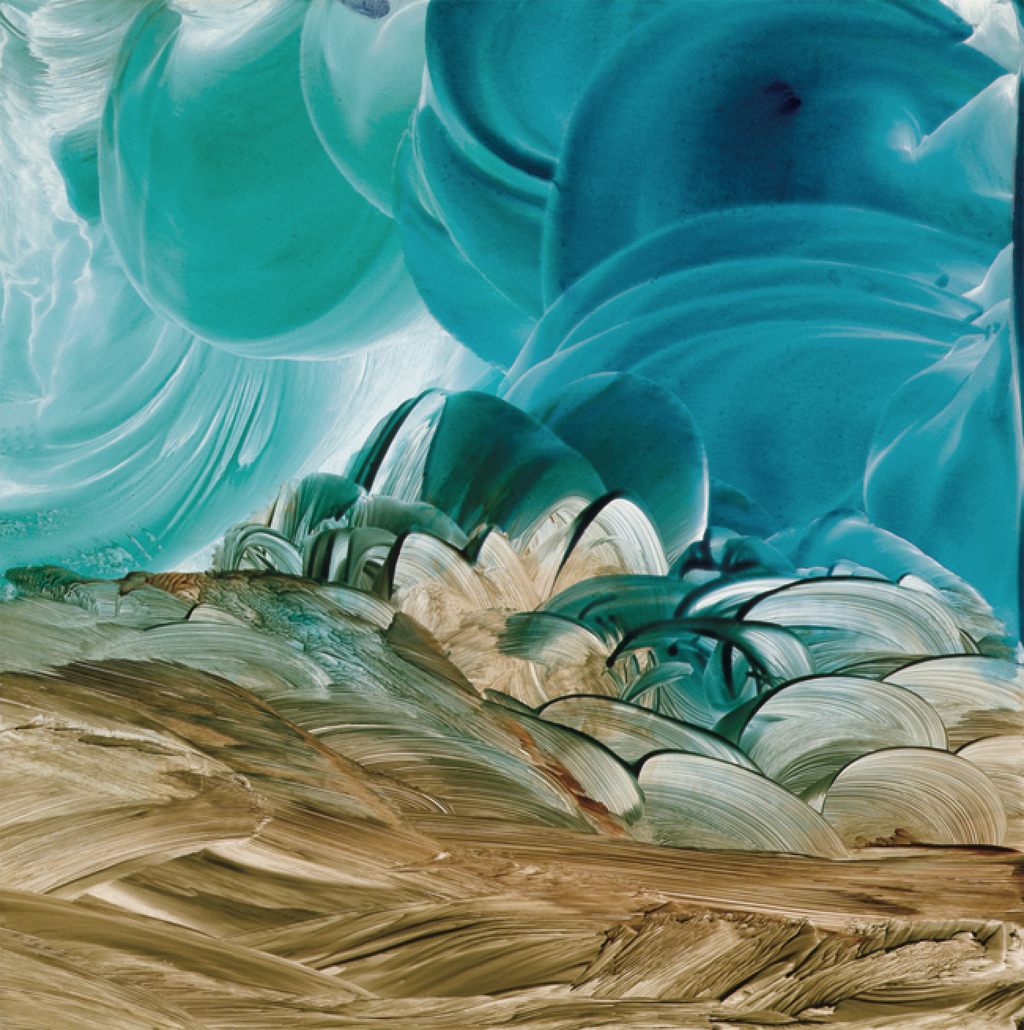
Trinity_108S05NG, 3.3"x4"

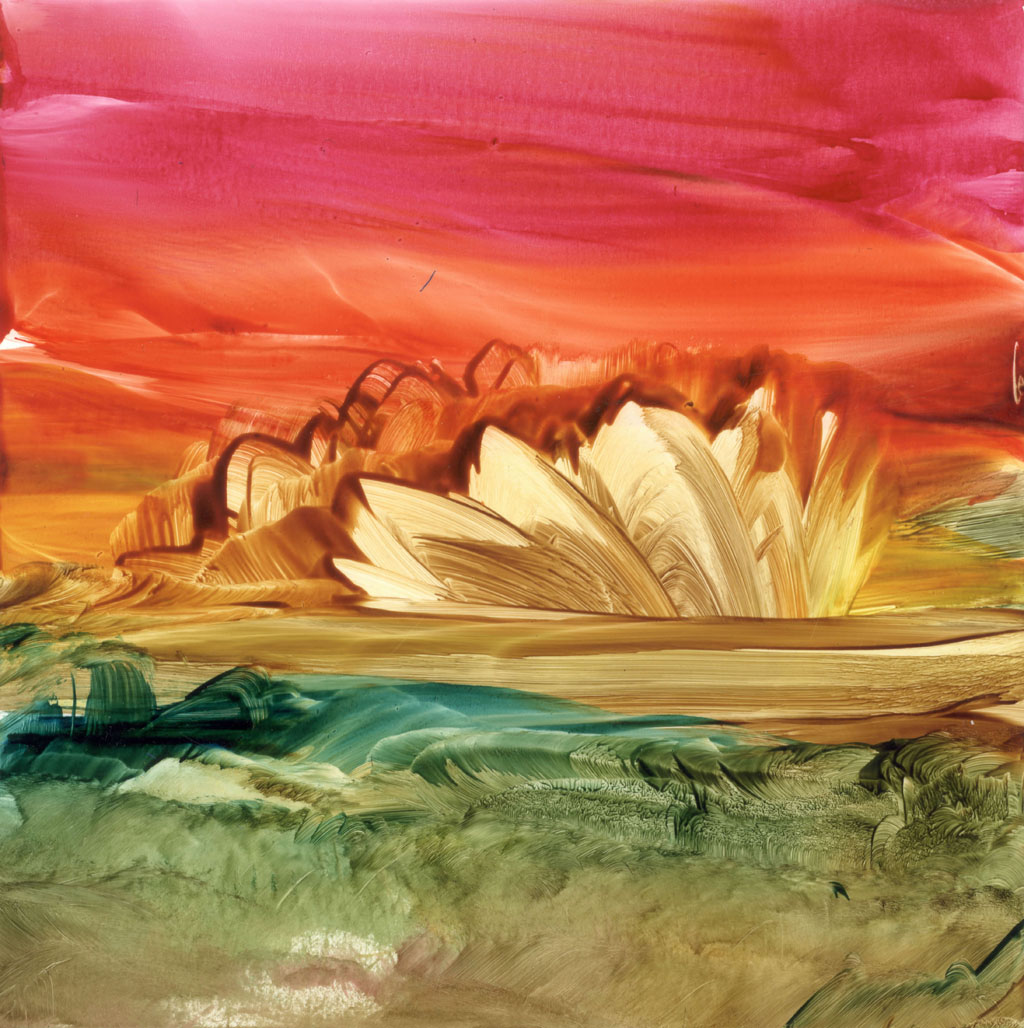
Creation_102S05NG, 3.3"x4"

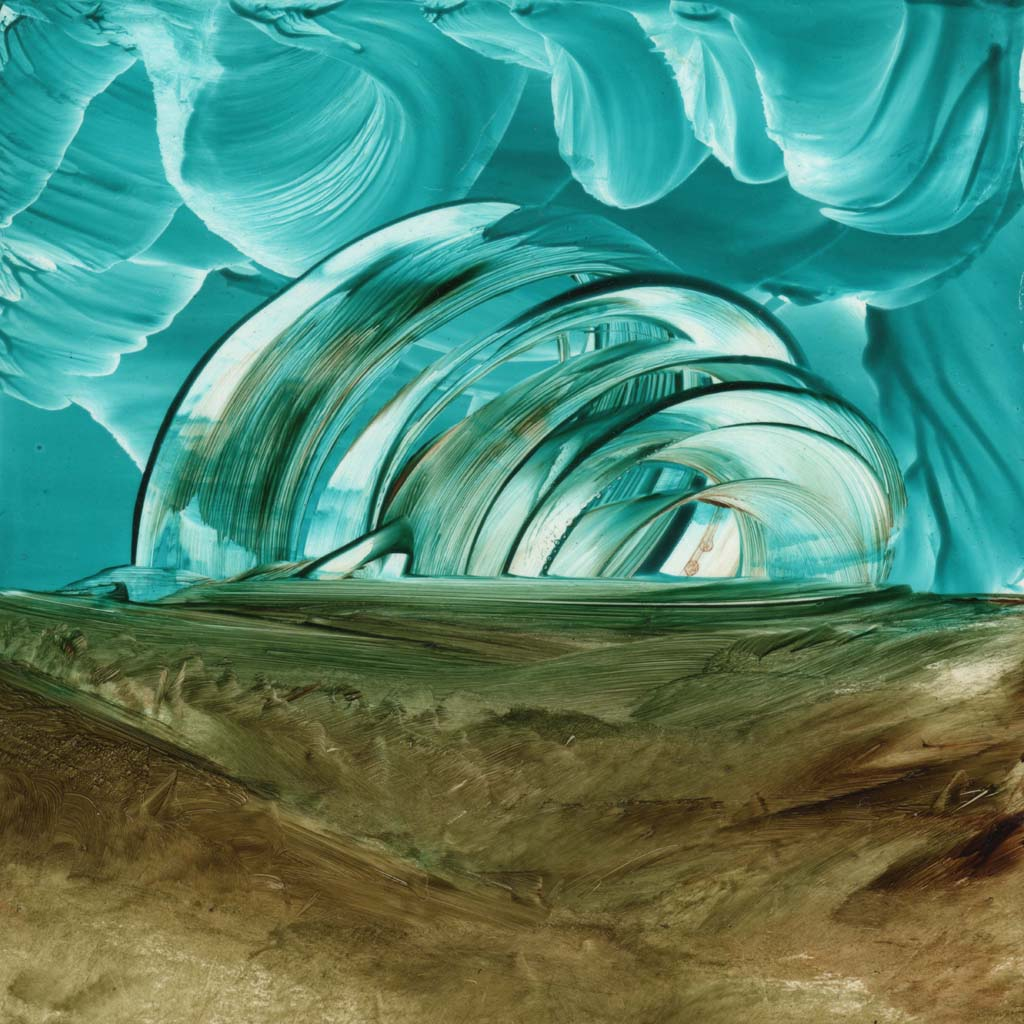
Trinity_030S05NG, 3.3"x4"

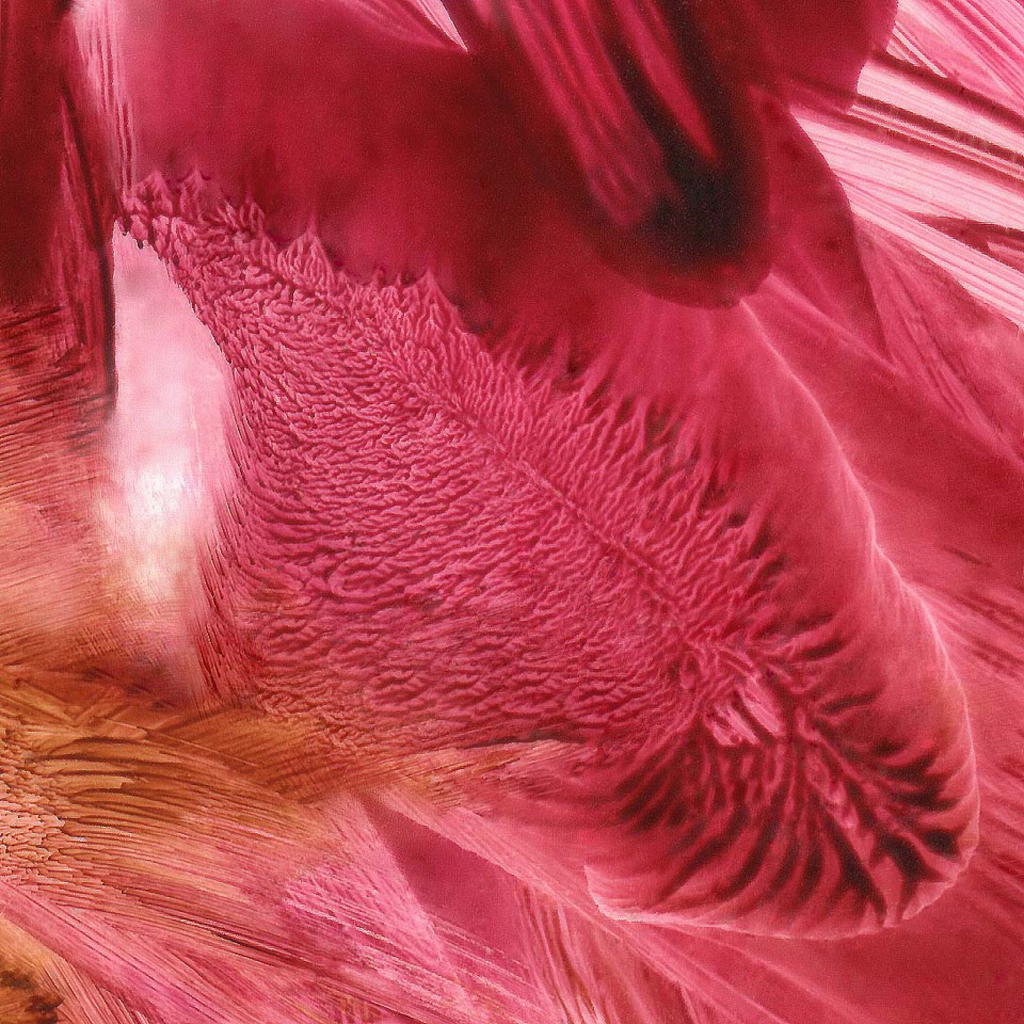
Unveiling _105S05NG, 3.3"x4"

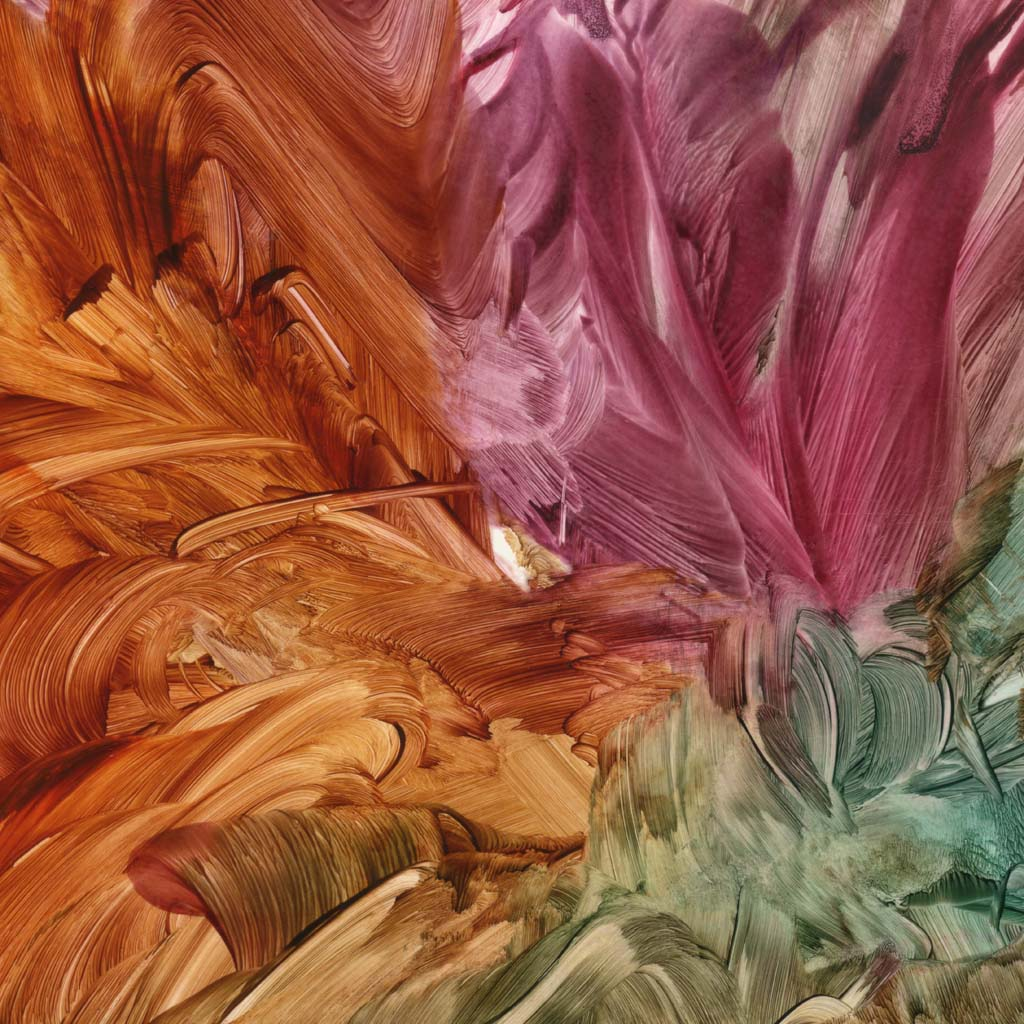
Abundance_104S05NG, 3.3"x4"

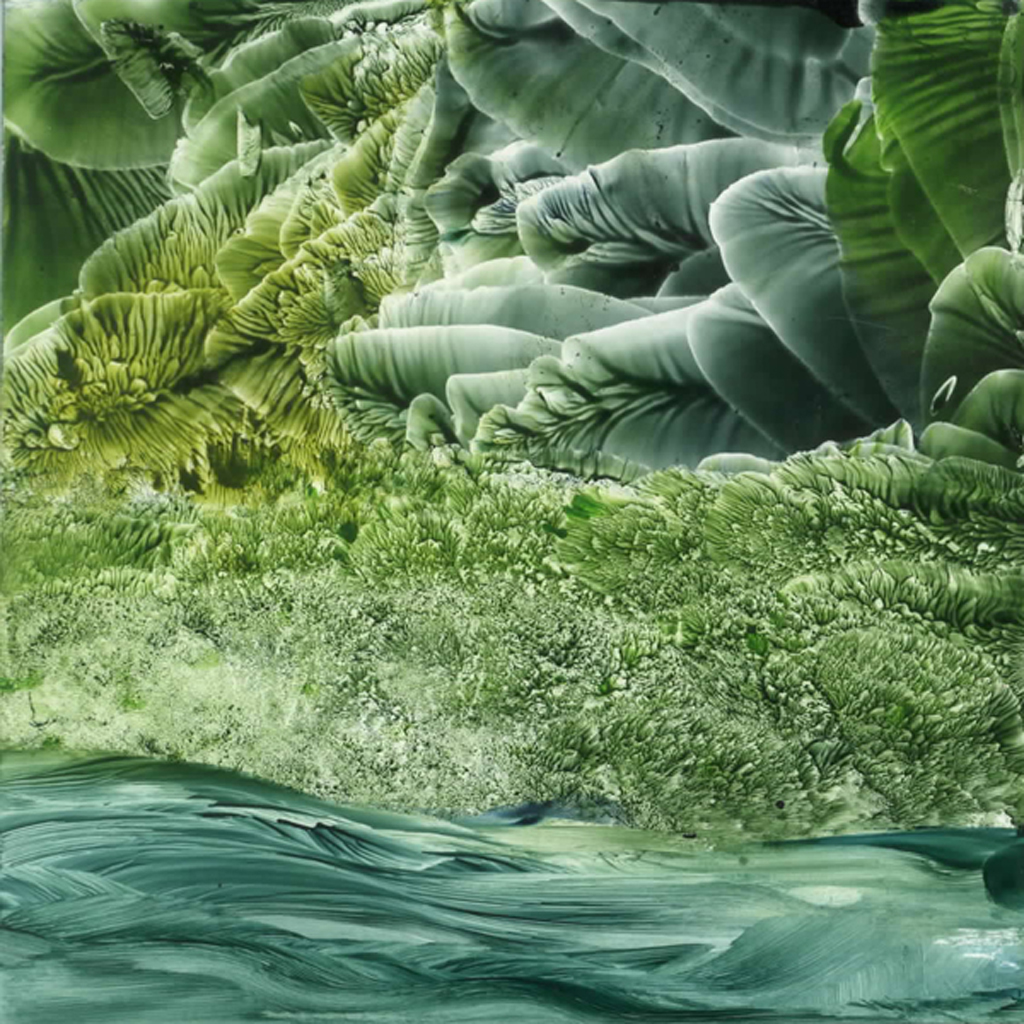
Mother Nature_029S05NG, 3.3"x4"

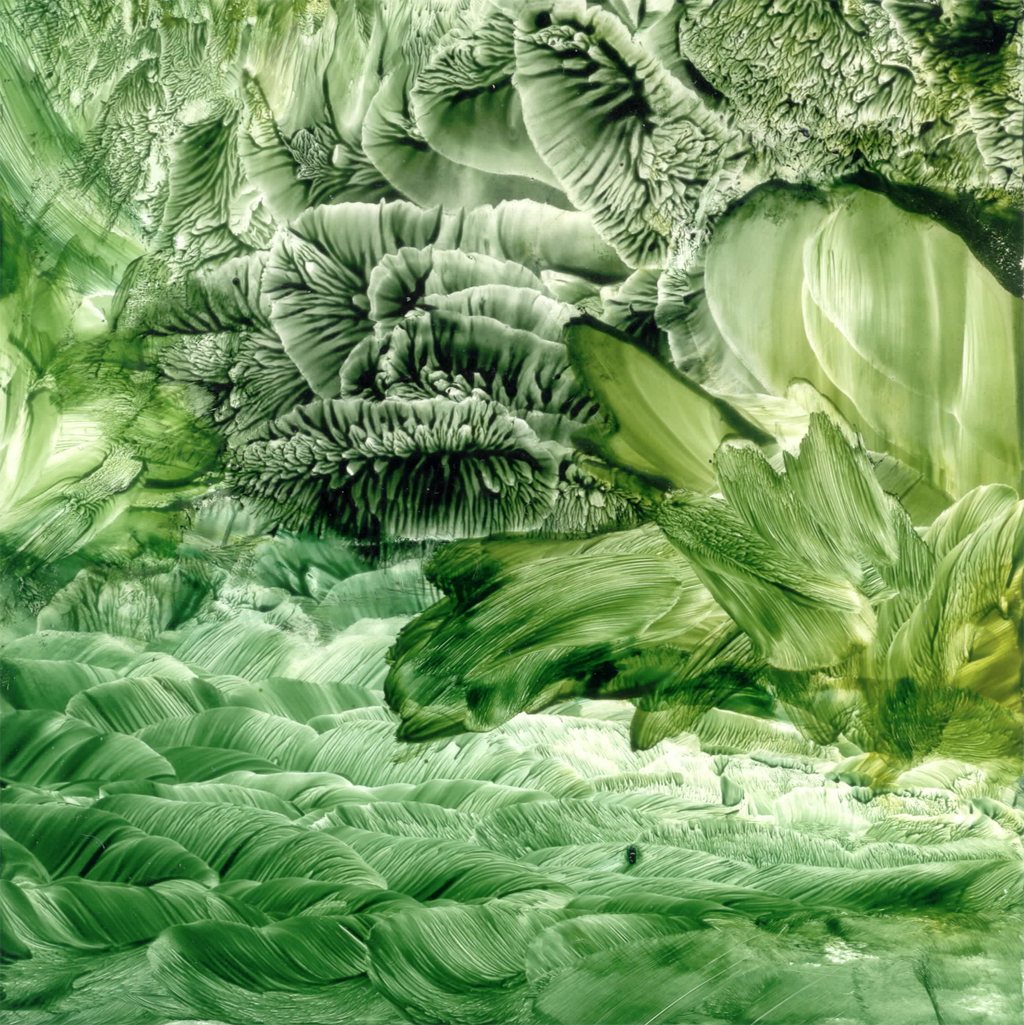
Mother Nature_109S05NG, 3.3"x4"

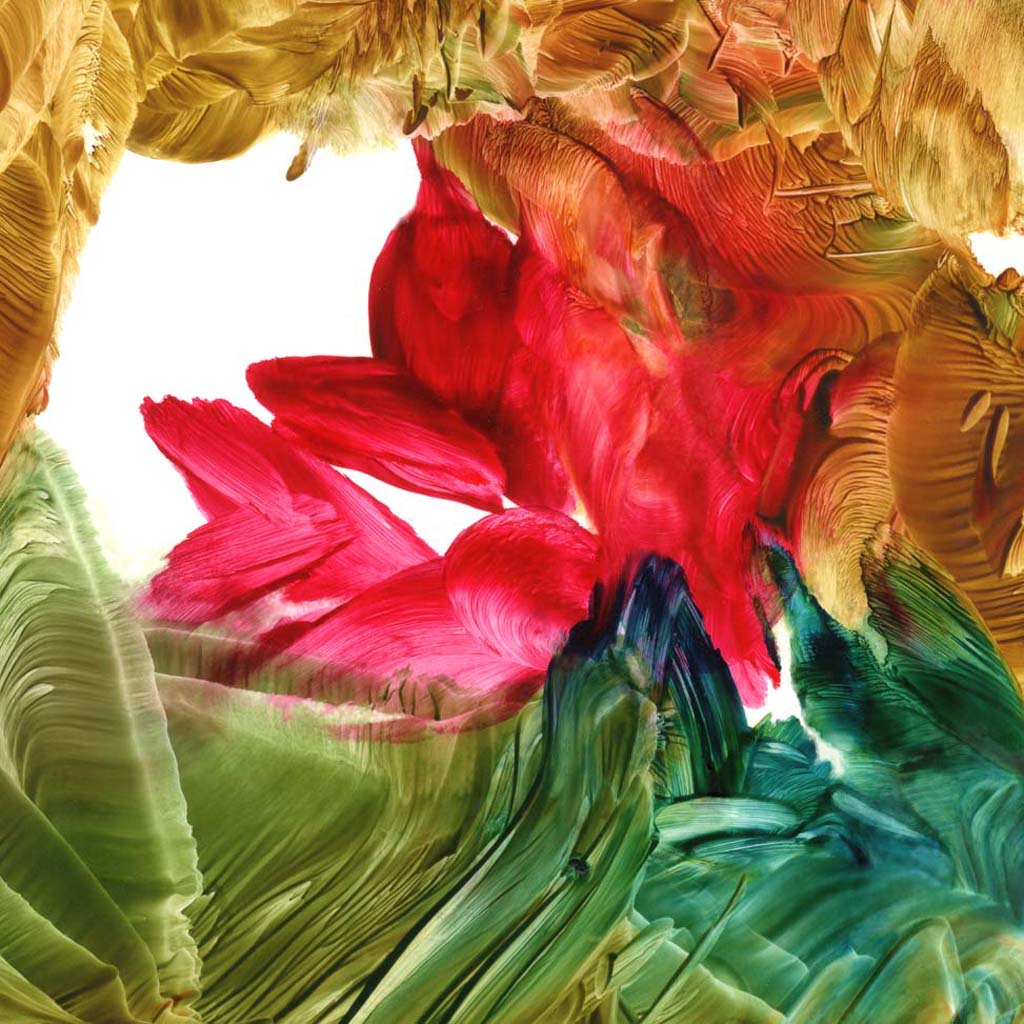
Life_107S05NG, 3.3"x4"

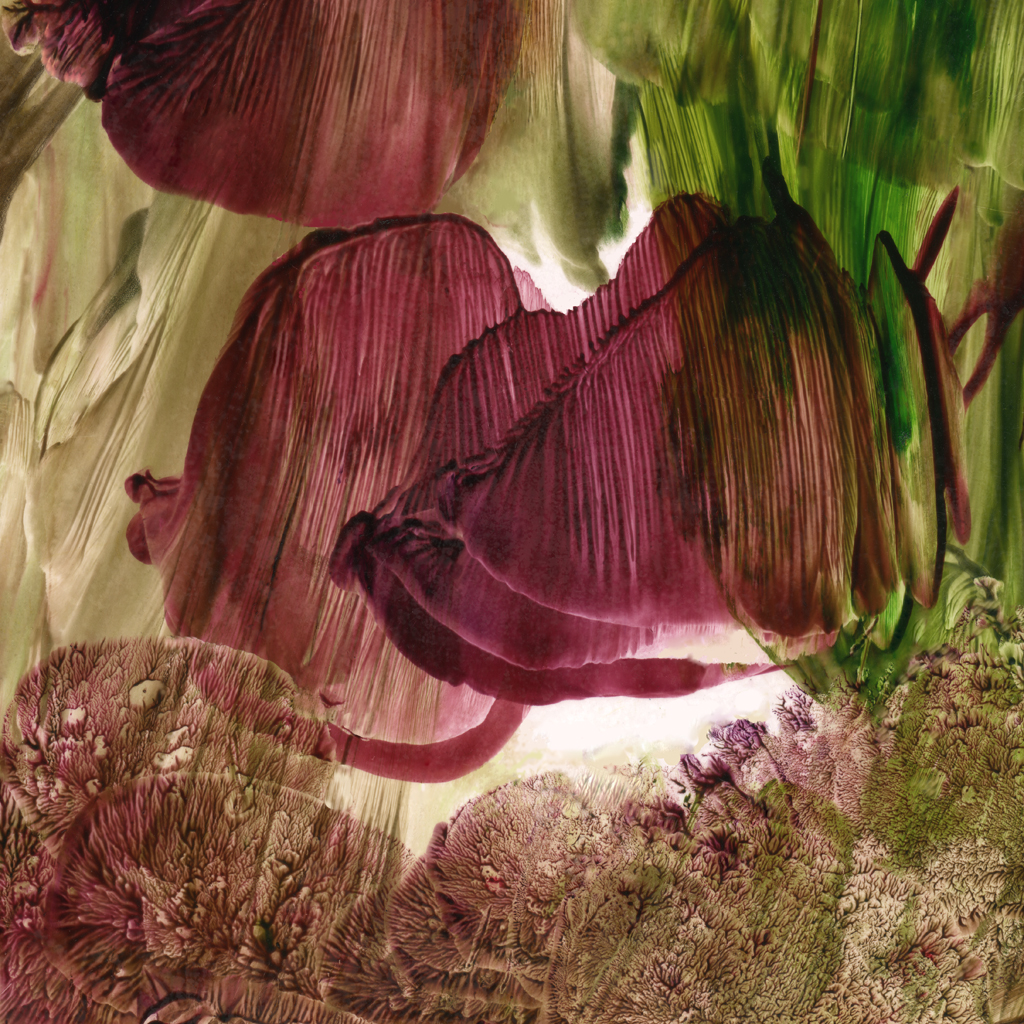
Mother Earth_106S05NG, 3.3"x4"

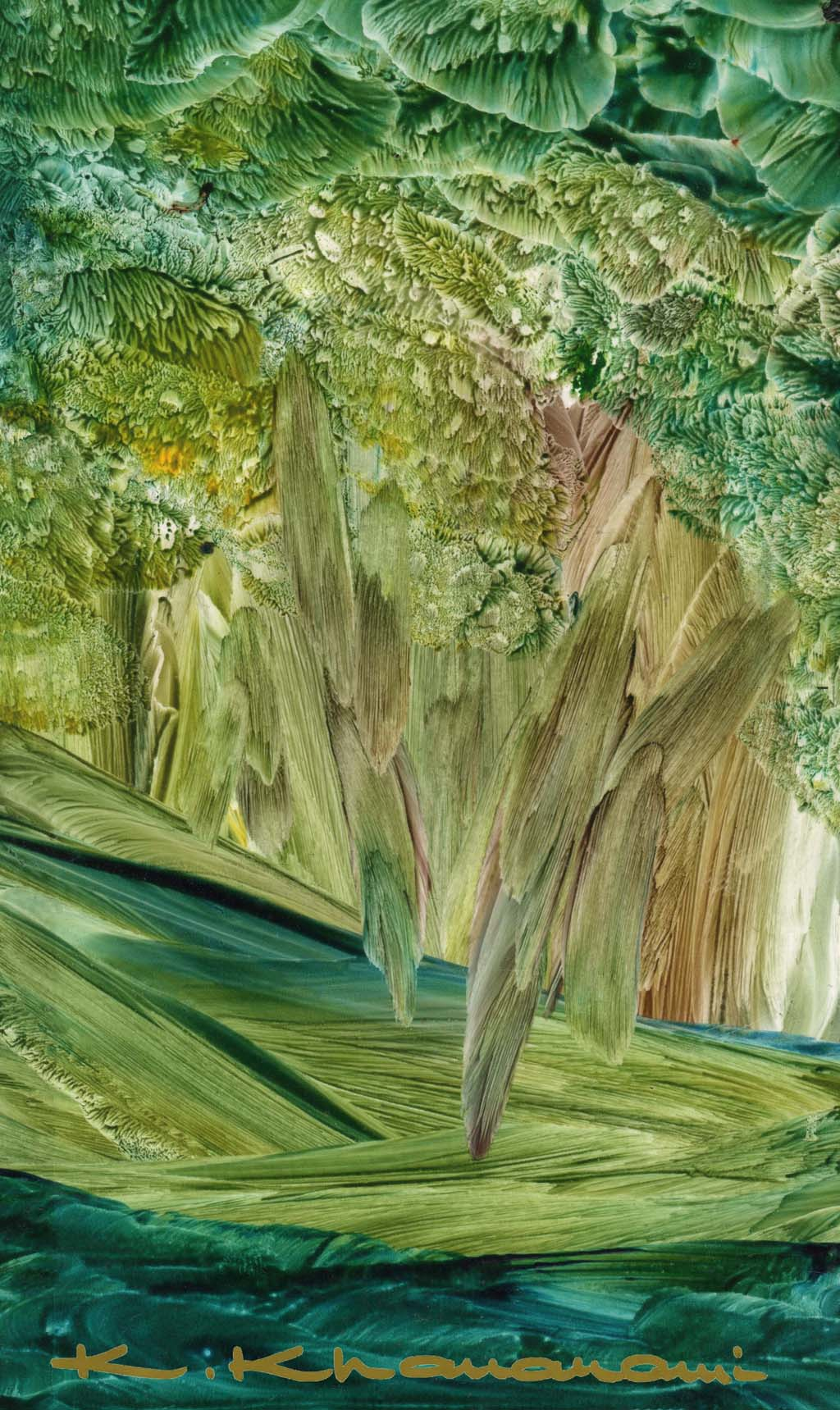
Oneness_028S05NG, 40"x28"

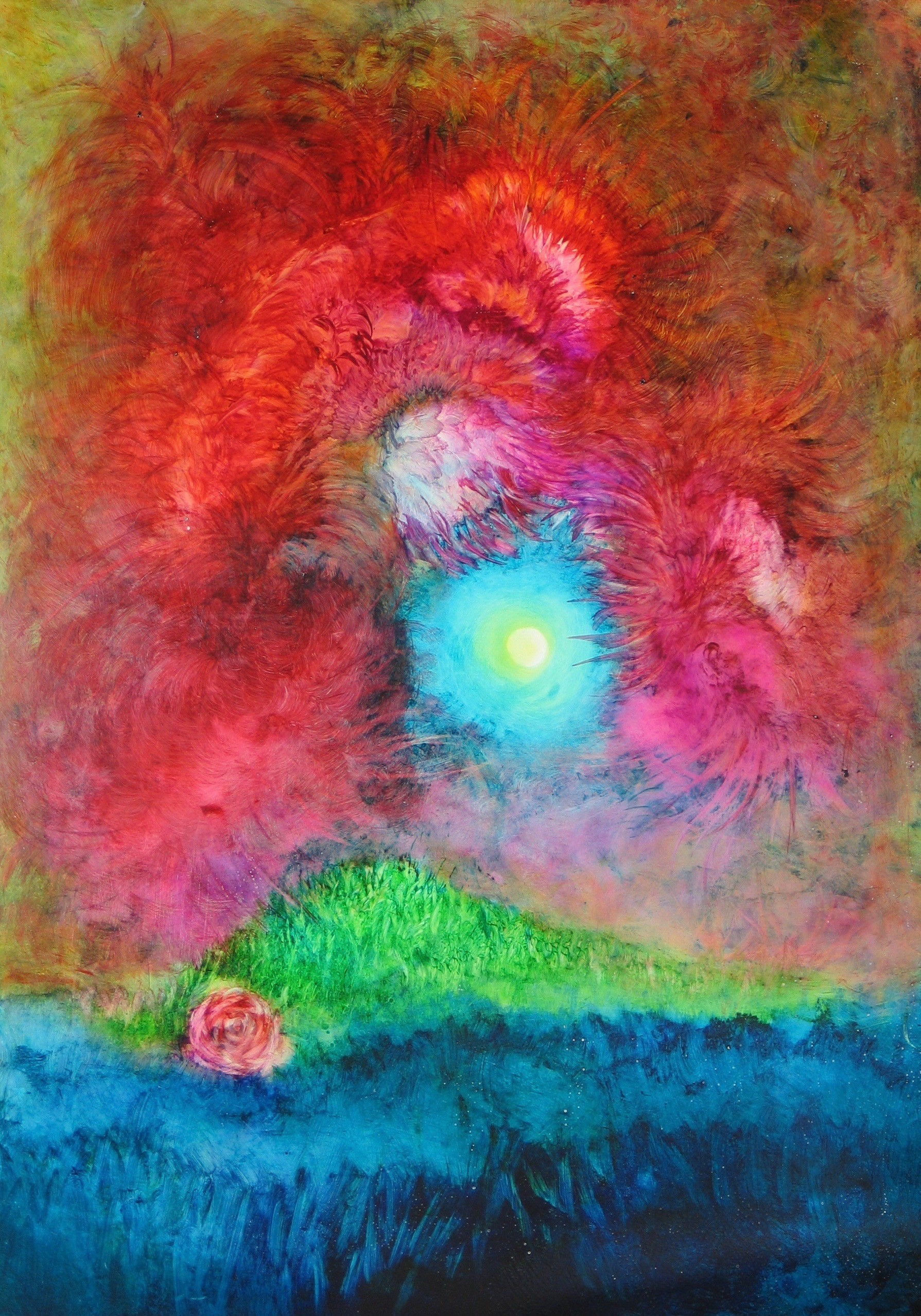
Island of Love_046L04EN, 40"x28"
