= James Bohary =

American painter

James Bohary (born 1940 in Brooklyn, New York) is an American abstract expressionist painter. He was born to an English mother (Alice Wood born in Bolton Lancashire in 1907) and an Indonesian father William. He has studied graphic design, illustration, drawing, as well as art education (B.S. from New York University). He emerged from the New York Studio School in 1969, where he studied painting and drawing with Philip Guston. His influences include prehistoric art, Sassetta, Rembrandt, Cézanne, and Willem de Kooning.

His paintings, including the new ones, exemplify many characteristics of the abstract expressionism of the modernist period. They are painted in thick, multilayered impastos, gestural, heavily textured, and sometimes with a sense of horror vacui with gestural details extending over every area of the painting. His working methods involve years of building dense masses of oil paint. A wet-in-wet layer is allowed to rest, sometimes over a long period, then more layers are added.

His paintings can be found in the following museums: the Corcoran Gallery of Art in Washington, D.C., the Hood Museum of Art in Hanover, New Hampshire, the National Academy of Design in New York City, the Snite Museum of Art at Notre Dame University, the Wellesley College Museum, and the Indiana University Art Museum.

Bohary has received numerous awards, including the American Academy & Institute of Arts and Letters Award (1985) and Certificate of Merit, National Academy of Design (1993). He was elected as a Full Member of the National Academy of Design (1994).

He has taught at such schools as Queens College, Parsons School of Fine Arts, New York Studio School, Binghamton University (where he still teaches) and Dartmouth College.
