= Macro Sea =

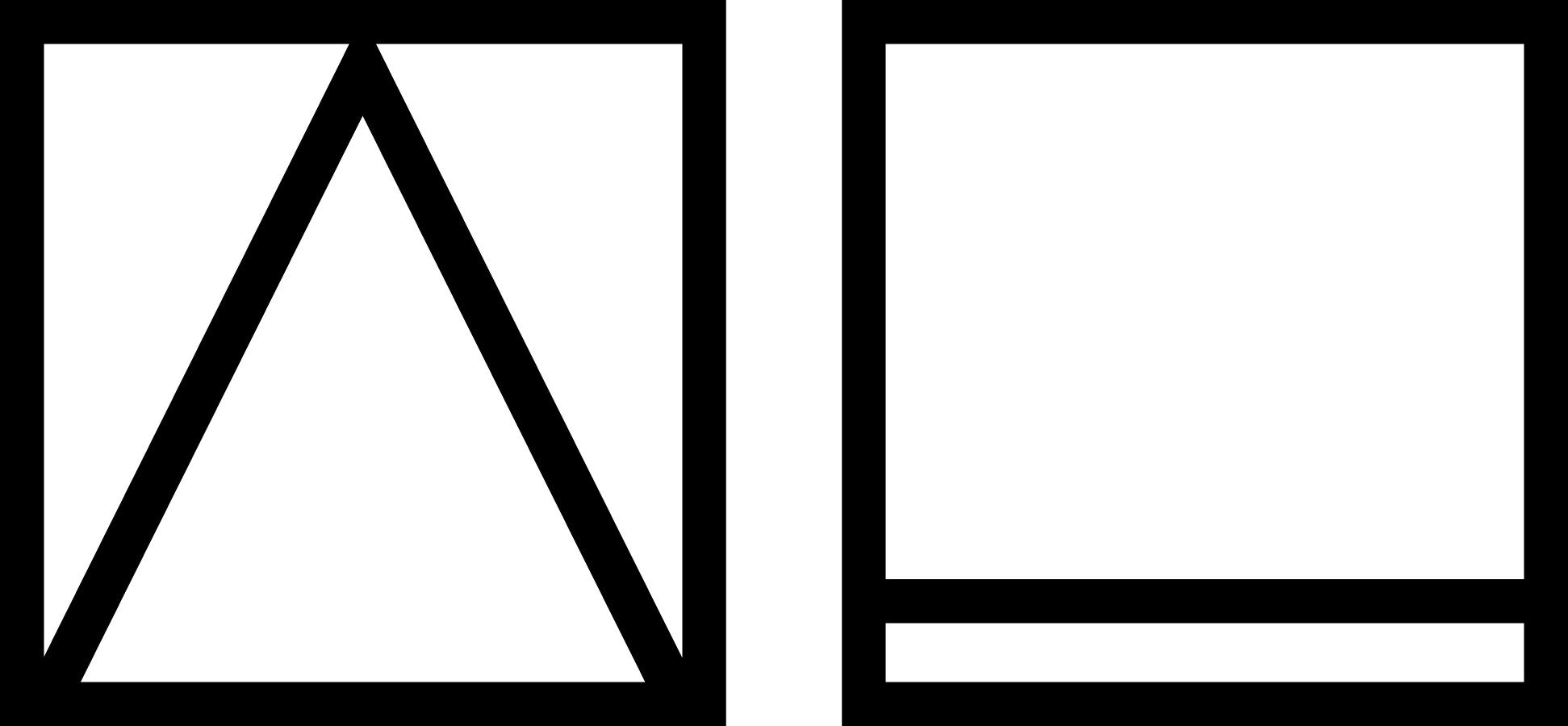
- Type: Corporation
- Industry: Real estate development, Urban design, Interim Use Projects
- Founded: 2009; 17 years ago in New York City, New York, U.S.
- Founder: David Belt
- Headquarters: New York, NY
- Area served: International
- Key people: David Belt, Rebecca Birmingham, Nicko Elliott, Liz Song, Stephanie Hemshrot
- Services: Real estate development, Architecture, Sustainable Design, and Urban Design
- Website: www.macro-sea.com

Macro Sea is an American real estate development firm formed in 2009 by developer David Belt. Primarily known for its development of adaptive reuse and interim use projects, Macro Sea has been the subject of substantial media coverage recently because of its development of New Lab, Building 128 in the Brooklyn Navy Yard. Their portfolio includes educational, arts, retail, residential buildings, student housing, and cultural centers.

== History ==
Organizationally, Macro Sea is unique in that it exists as a series of ongoing collaborations between experts in a wide variety of disciplines including lawyers, artists, architects, designers and others. The company has served as the entrepreneurial framework for most of Belt's development pursuits since 2009.

Early collaborators included Jocko Weyland (2009–2011), Alix Feinkind (2009–2012), Elise DeChard (2011–2013), and Alexandra Escamilla (2012–2014). Currently the firm is composed of Belt, Rebecca Birmingham who serves as Creative Director and General Counsel (2010–present), Nicko Elliott as design director (2013–present), Liz Song as Designer and Project Manager (2015–present), Studio Director Stephanie Hemshrot (2014–present), and Special Projects Coordinator Allison Moss (2016–present).

== Notable projects ==
=== New Lab ===
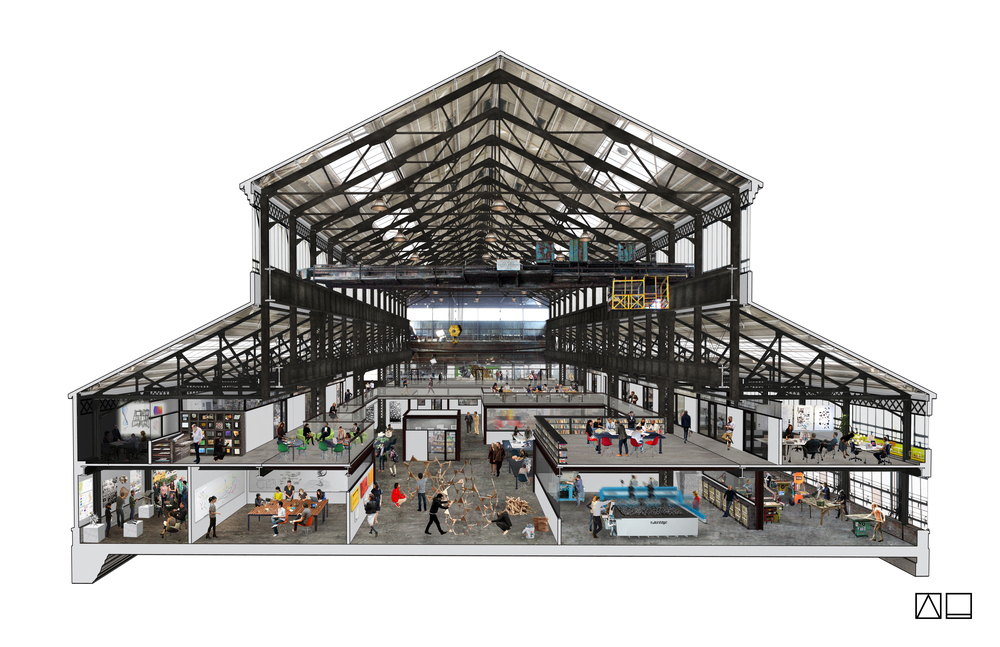
Front view artist's rendering of New Lab. Building 128 of the Brooklyn Navy Yard

The result of a public-private partnership with the City of New York, New Lab is a repurposing of Building 128 in the Brooklyn Navy Yard, which was a boiler and machine shop for ship-making during most of the last century. It serves as a design and new manufacturing facility for companies and individuals creating products and hardware, many of which use additive manufacturing technologies. New Lab opened in June 2016 and has received substantial recent coverage in the media because of its significant role in attracting new industry back to the once dormant Navy Yard.

A major goal of the project is to provide an environment that fosters designers, engineers, and entrepreneurs who are hardware and product focused and allow them the ability to consult with one another. The 84,000 sq. ft. structure provides an interdisciplinary setting for companies and individuals working in product design, material science, biology, industrial design, and physical computing. New Lab's initial members included Honeybee Robotics, Nanotronics Imaging, 10x Beta, Spuni, RockPaperRobot, Terreform ONE, The Living, D.N.I., Eco Systems, NEA Studio, Jenna Spevack Studio, The Extrapolation Factory, Eric Forman Studio, Zago, and Itemology. Strongarm Technologies, Voltaic Systems, Farmshelf, Waverly Labs, and Renovate Robotics are more recent additions to the roster.

=== G27 Global Institute ===
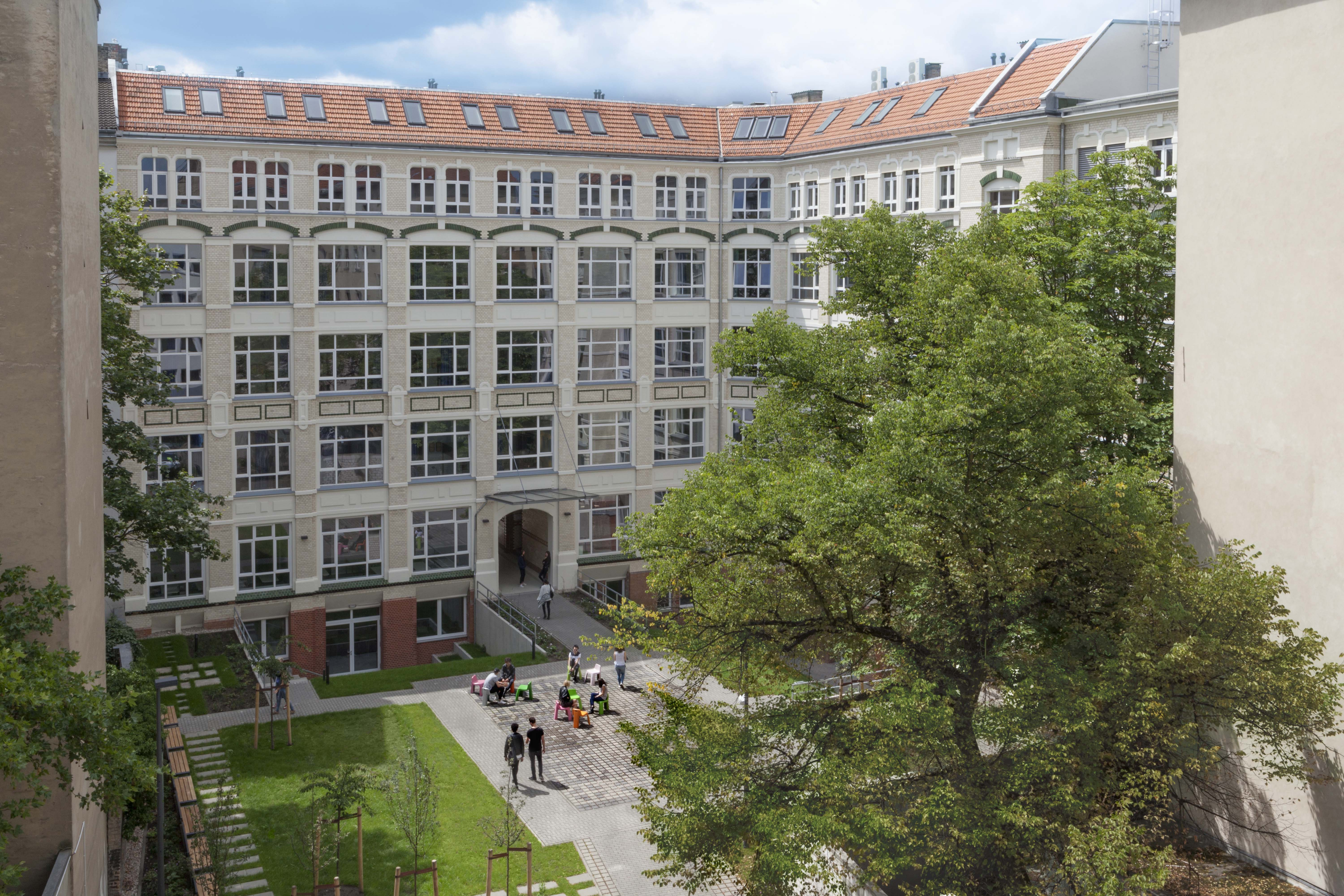
Exterior of G27 Global Institute

Located in the historic Kreuzberg neighborhood in Berlin, Germany, G27 Global Institute is a "design-centric" residence for study-abroad students. The project confronts the current design paradigm of student housing as it is, according to Belt, "one of the most overlooked and under-explored design disciplines. At its best, it's institutional and sterile and at its worst is confined to dilapidated couches and condescending amenities." A recent article in Slate magazine said the project was indicative of a major paradigm shift in student housing. In line with Macro Sea's theme of finding buildings that have a history with which a forthcoming project will resonate, the firm identified the former Roka manufacturing complex in Berlin.

In order to realize their vision, Macro Sea and sister firm DBI Projects completely gutted and renovated the 85,000 sq. ft. complex and courtyard. Roka's facility would be transformed into "a five-story front building located at 27 Gneisenaustrasse, home to future administrative offices and faculty apartments, and a large six-story factory building set back from the street and separated by a magnificent tree-lined interior courtyard."

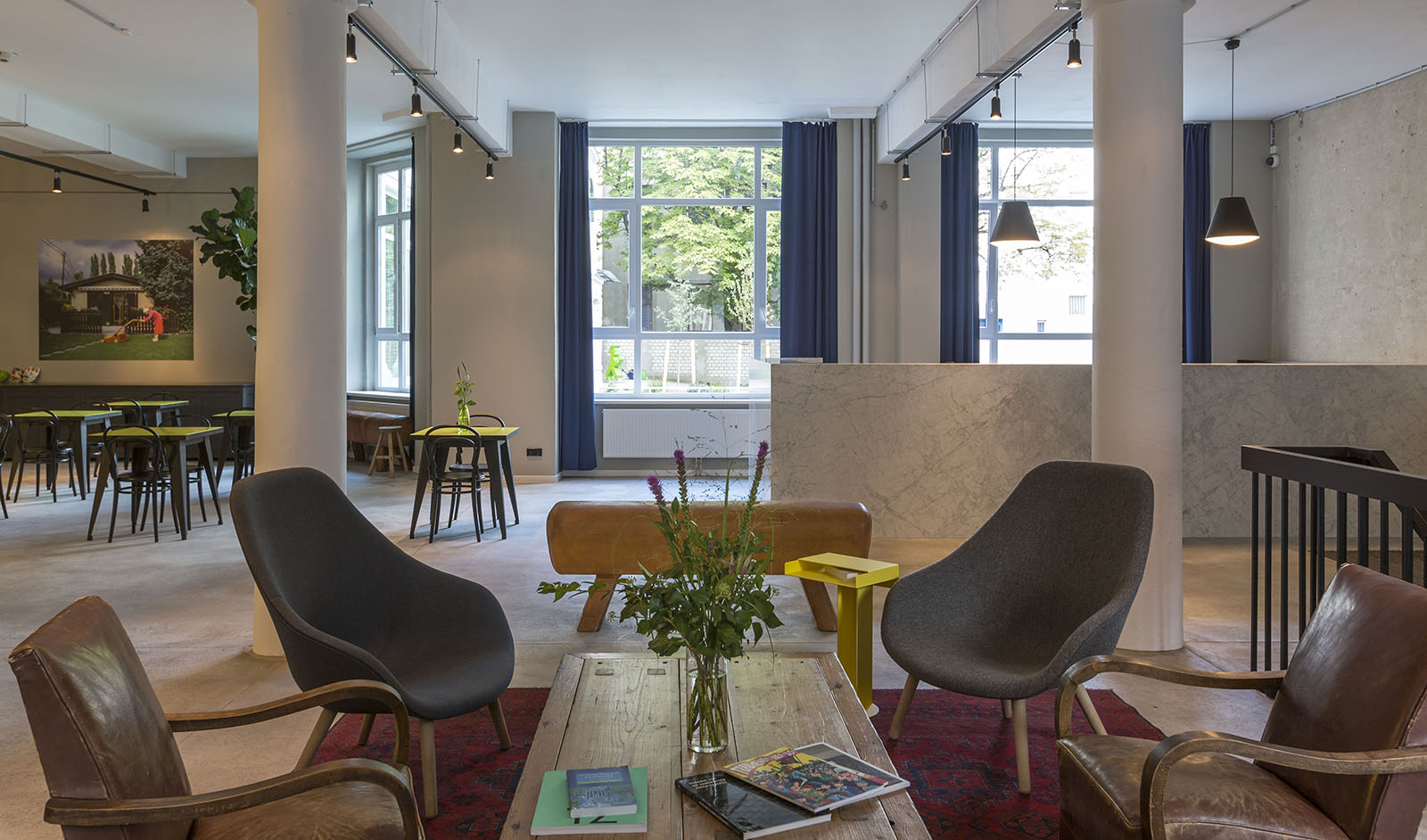
G27 Global Institute interior

Macro Sea conceived G27 "as a veritable vertical campus, meaning that spaces for living, academic classes, dining and socializing are configured in a vertical fashion, creating a campus within a building." The interior of G27 consists of contemporary, custom-made and vintage furniture of Bavarian and Danish origin. Many of the furnishings are repurposed local items and salvaged objects from the original facility. From a design perspective G27 is laid out to encourage interaction between students. The campus orients around an open common room that contains a large fireplace and a marble bar and cafe. The residential portion of the building will house 200 people and the rooms and bathrooms are customizable. G27 opened for the Fall 2015 semester and has been leased to the Council on International Educational Exchange.

=== Glassphemy! ===
Glassphemy! is a "psychological recycling experiment" devised by Macro Sea in 2010 as a way to incite the public to rethink contemporaneous discourses around recycling. The project was set up in a private space in Gowanus, Brooklyn, as a 20' x 30' steel and bulletproof glass structure provided a means to "make recycling a more direct, visceral experience and to purge some New York aggression simultaneously." Participants were afforded the opportunity to throw glass bottles at one another without harm. Standing at one end of a raised platform those involved could hurl their bottles at people standing or walking by on the lower opposite platform, but with the protection of the bulletproof glass.

Design and installation on the project was the collaborative effort of Vamos Architects, John Wischmann, Paul Maiello, and Jason Krugman. It was made of plexiglass, steel, wood, responsive light installation, and glass bottles. Glassphemy! was featured in the 2013 MoMA Design and Violence Exhibition and book.

=== Mobile Pools ===
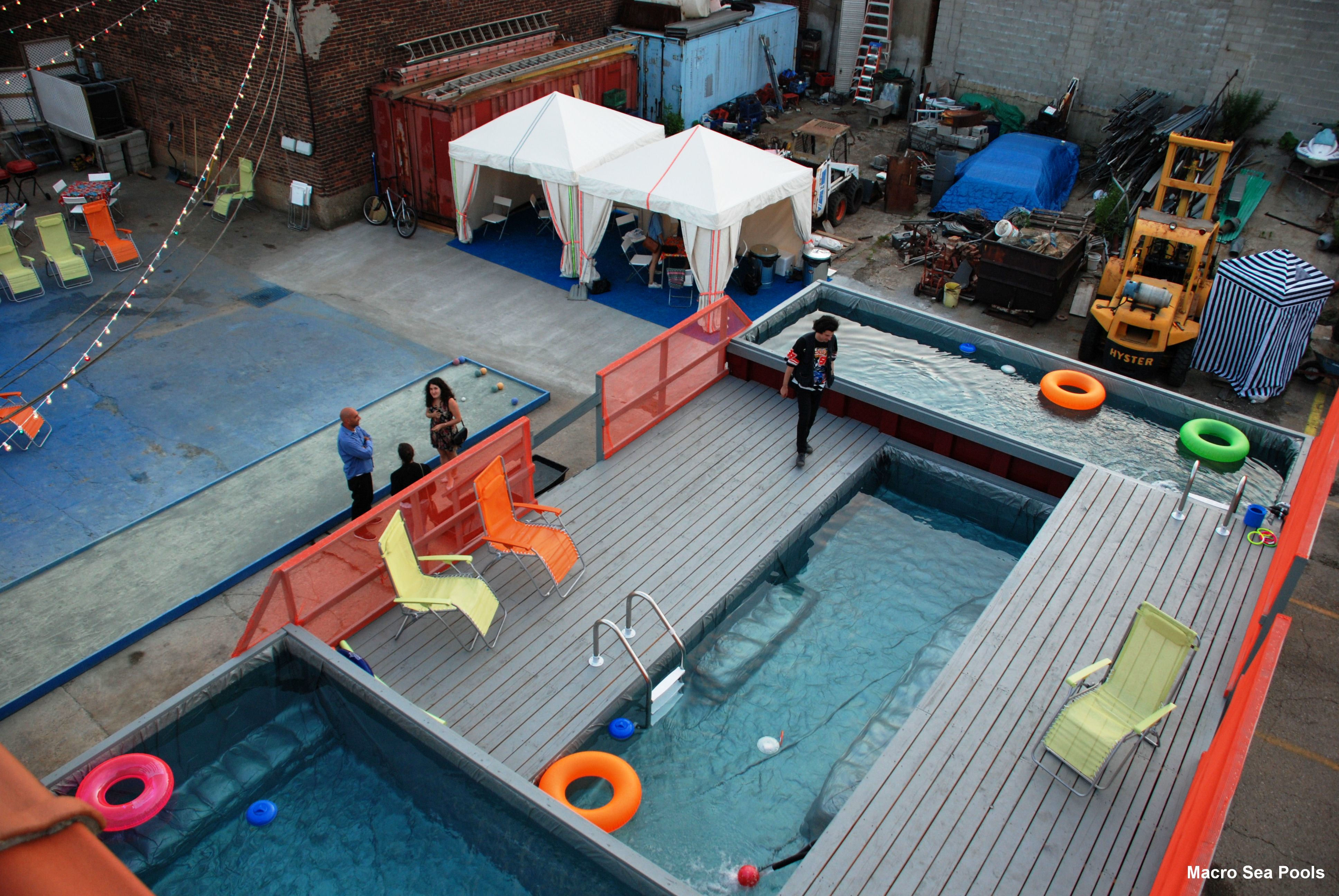
MacroSeaDumpsterPools2009

Macro Sea's 2009-2010 mobile pool project, sometimes referred to as the "dumpster pools" was one of the first projects the firm undertook and served as a "way to experiment with underused space and materials, re-purposing them with urban renewal in mind. The pools were made from donated dumpsters which were readily available due to the economic downturn at the time. They were cleaned, sealed with plastic liners, and given filtration systems much like those found on above ground pools in other parts of the country. Belt, Jocko Weyland and Alix Feinkind used the idea as a "template for a larger idea: turning eyesore strip malls into artsy community destinations, with Dumpster pools and other indie attractions." At the time, the firm had plans to re-purpose a strip mall in Atlanta, Georgia, with a similar adaptive aesthetic.

The next year, in 2010, the New York City Mayor's Office and the Department of Transportation invited Macro Sea to participate in NYC's Annual Summer Streets event. The pools were set up at the Park Avenue Viaduct, on the east side of Park Avenue between 40th and 41st Streets, for three Saturdays in August 2010. Hundreds of New Yorkers came out to swim over the course of the three weekends. In 2011 the pools were featured in the Venice Biennale.

== See also ==
- Antonelli, Paola, Jamer Hunt, and Michelle Millar Fisher (2015). Design and Violence. MoMa Publications. ISBN 9780870709685
