= Roosevelt Warehouse =

Building in Detroit, United States

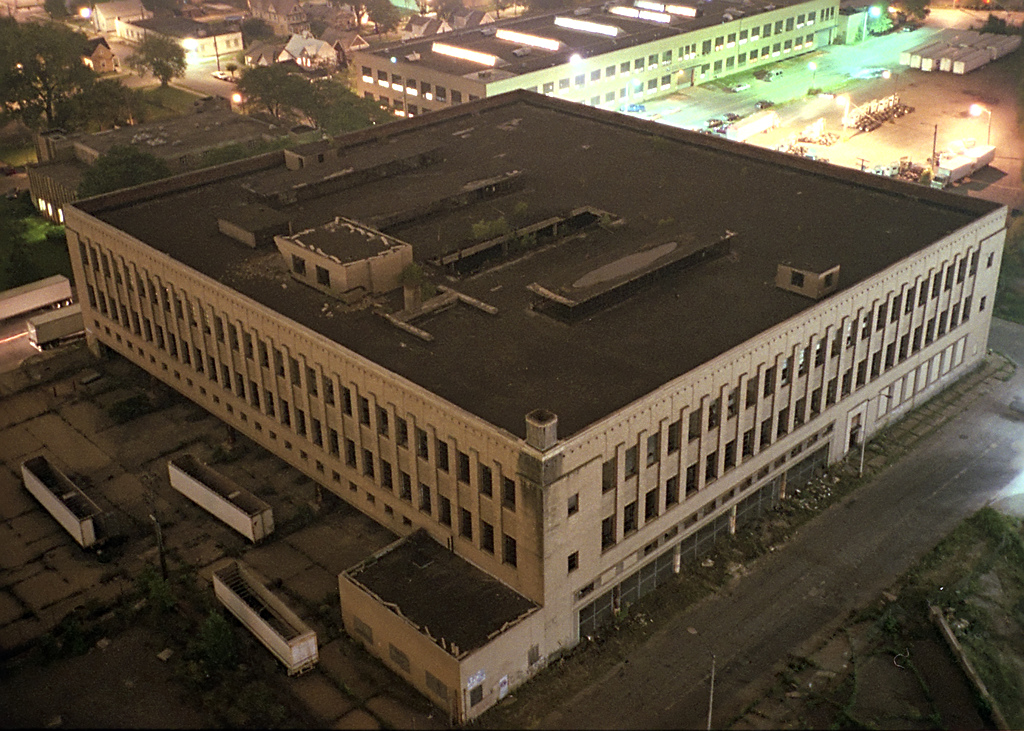
- The Roosevelt warehouse Detroit school book depository building in August 2000, after being damaged by fire and abandoned. View from a taller adjacent building at night. Small trees are visible growing on the third floor beneath a hole in the roof.
- Interactive map of the Roosevelt Warehouse area
- Alternative names: Detroit Public Schools Book Depository

General information
- Status: Detroit headquarters of Newlab
- Type: Warehouse
- Location: 14th & Marantette Street, Detroit, Michigan
- Coordinates: 42°19′42″N 83°4′32″W
- Completed: 1926
- Renovated: 2019 - 2021
- Owner: Ford Motor Company

Design and construction
- Architect: Albert Kahn

Other information
- Public transit: DDOT 1, 2 SMART FAST Michigan 261

The Roosevelt Warehouse, more commonly known as the Detroit Public Schools Book Depository, is a building on 14th & Marantette Street in Detroit, Michigan. It is understood to have been designed by Albert Kahn and that it was originally a Post Office before being used as the Public Schools' surplus equipment depository. It is currently owned by Ford Motor Company, who renovated it as part of its new Michigan Central Mobility Innovation District, transforming it into an innovation center. The building is home to the Detroit headquarters of Newlab, a multi-disciplinary technology company.

== History ==
The building caught fire in 1987. The fire and efforts to extinguish it heavily damaged much of the supplies inside, which included science and sports equipment, scissors, crayons, and books, many still unused and in their original wrapping. After the fire the building was abandoned, along with all of its contents. The reason why the building's contents were not salvaged by Detroit Public Schools is unknown.

Over the years of abandonment, the building and its contents were heavily vandalized and further damaged by scrappers.

In 2009 a frozen human corpse was found in the basement in a lift-shaft. It took 24 hours before the authorities attended to the scene. Previously easy to enter, the building was then boarded up. The contents of the warehouse were removed over the summer of 2012 in preparation for possible conversion into a parking garage.

In 2018, both the warehouse and the Michigan Central Station were purchased by the Ford Motor Company.

In 2021, it was announced that Newlab would be the first major tenant in the building.

On April 25, 2023, the building officially reopened as the Detroit headquarters for Newlab.
