= Matthew Putman =

Matthew Putman may refer to:

- Matthew Putman (musician) (born 1977), American drummer, percussionist, and multi-instrumentalist based in Arkansas
- Matthew Putman (scientist), American scientist, educator, musician and film/stage producer
