= Nanotronics Imaging =

- Company type: Private
- Industry: Nanotechnology
- Founded: 2010
- Founders: Matthew Putman, John Putman
- Headquarters: Cuyahoga Falls, Ohio
- Key people: Matthew Putman, CEO
- Website: www.nanotronics.ai

Nanotronics Imaging is a nanotechnology startup in Cuyahoga Falls, Ohio. It has an office in Brooklyn, New York at New Lab and manufactures its devices in California.

== History ==
Nanotronics was founded by Matthew Putman, a materials science professor at Columbia University, and his father John Putman. Nanotronics has received $7 million in venture capital funding from Founders Fund and PayPal founder Peter Thiel, who sits on the company's board of directors.

In 2015, Nanotronics acquired Franklin Mechanical & Control, a manufacturer of optical equipment based in Hollister, California.

== Products ==
Nanotronics builds hardware and software that can be used to see features down to the nanometer scale. It integrates off-the-shelf high resolution microscopes with custom software, including machine learning and artificial intelligence. Nanotronics technology has a number of medical applications, such as screening for cervical cancer.

In April 2015, Nanotronics announced a new virtual reality system, called nVisible, that allows anyone to "walk through" a 3D model of objects at the microscopic scale.
