= Eric Forman =

Eric Forman may refer to:

- Eric Forman (That '70s Show), fictional character on television series That '70s Show, played by Topher Grace
- Eric Forman (artist) (born 1973), New York–based artist and designer

== See also ==
- Eric Foreman, fictional character on television series House, played by Omar Epps
