= DBI =

DBI may refer to:

- dBi, decibel isotropic
- DBI (gene), the gene encoding diazepam binding inhibitor in humans
- DBI Beverage, a subsidiary of Ingram Entertainment
- DBI, a company founded by David Belt which now operates as DBI Projects and DBI Construction Consultants
- Beck Depression Inventory, a psychological test used to measure depression levels
- Dahabshil Bank International, Somalia
- Data Bus Inversion - a method of power saving in DDR4
- Davies–Bouldin index, a metric for evaluating clustering algorithms
- Davie-Brown Index, an independent index for brand marketers
- Delaware Biotechnology Institute, University of Delaware, U.S.
- Dizionario Biografico degli Italiani, the Biographical Dictionary of the Italians
- Doppelgänger brand image, Doublewalker in marketing
- Dubai, a city in the United Arab Emirates
- Dynamic binary instrumentation, a technique to change programs
- ISO 639:dbi or Doka, a Plateau language of Nigeria
- Perl DBI, a database interface for Perl
- Phenformin, by the trade name DBI
