= Dustin Yellin =

American artist

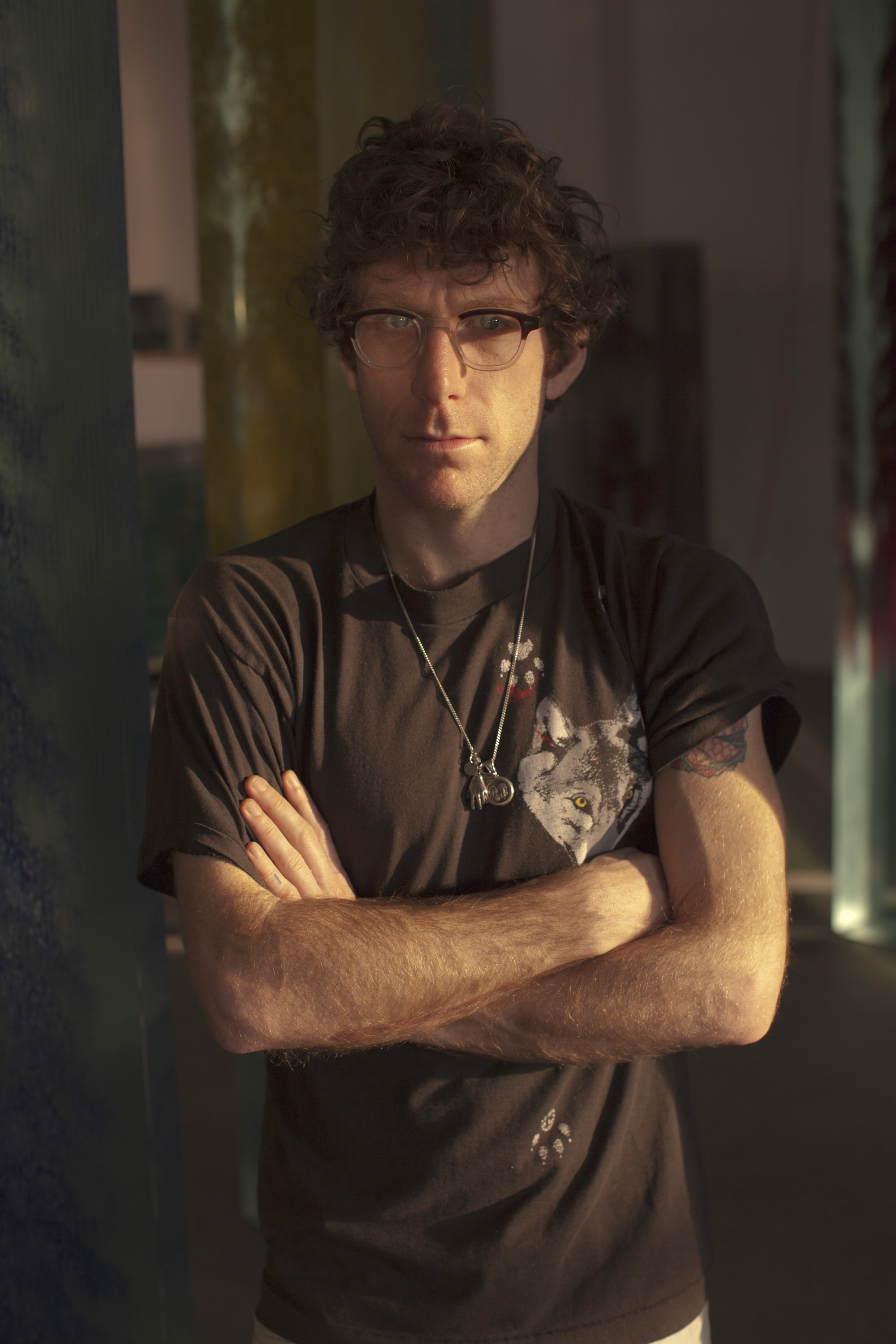
- Yellin In 2011
- Born: July 22, 1975 (age 49); Los Angeles, California, US
- Known for: Contemporary Art

Dustin Yellin (born July 22, 1975) is an American artist living in Brooklyn, New York. His work embeds "hundreds of little pictures, drawings and images clipped out of magazines, art books and the like" to form tableaux in miniature, which the critic Gilda Williams, writing in Artforum, noted provides viewers "the ability to occupy a divine vantage point while enjoying an overwhelming sense of discovery and wonder". These works, which the artist refers to as "Frozen Cinema", have been featured at sites including New York's Lincoln Center, the Kennedy Center in Washington, D.C, and the Brooklyn Museum, where Yellin's work is part of the permanent collection. Yellin has likewise participated in The Metropolitan Museum of Art's Artist Project. According to Andrew Durbin, "Yellin has formalized the central task of art—to archive: feelings, objects, events, selves—in his large glass blocks, recalling in their extreme hermeneutical diversity (forms within forms within forms, images within images within images) both as a past in which the representation of the human form was art's most recognizable enterprise and a future in which that enterprise is deeply complicated by the fact that the human form has been shredded, reformatted, revised, and redesigned, made precarious and permeable by technological and ecological shifts."

In parallel to his studio, Yellin is the Founder and President of Pioneer Works (PW), a non-profit cultural center in Red Hook, Brooklyn, that "builds community through the arts and sciences to create an open and inspired world". This "cultural hub and classroom, museum, studio, concert venue, rentable event space and more—spread across 24,000 square feet, three sweeping floors and a 20,000 square-foot garden" was established as a 501(c)(3) nonprofit in 2012. This "incubator where painters rub elbows with physicists" often collaborates with the likes of Google, and "features influential, Nobel Prize–winning scientists discussing some of science’s great answered questions" next to art exhibitions, such as PÒTOPRENS a survey of Haitian art which displayed "numerous monumental figurative sculptures in Pioneer Work’s yawning main space—a vibrant carnivalesque antidote to the classical sculpture courts of western museums".

Yellin is currently working on a piece entitled The Bridge, the work "aims to repurpose a tool of global energy production to influence conservation policy" by inverting, and anchoring a 1,000 foot long oil supertanker vertically in a harbor "with the stern pointed at the sky to remind people of the need for humanity to end the fossil fuel era as quickly as possible." This "ready-made artwork, complete with elevators and a viewing platform for visitors, capturing the sheer scale of our energy system" is currently being developed with "architect Bjarke Ingels and Arup, the design and engineering firm".
