= Eric Forman (artist) =

Artist and designer from New York

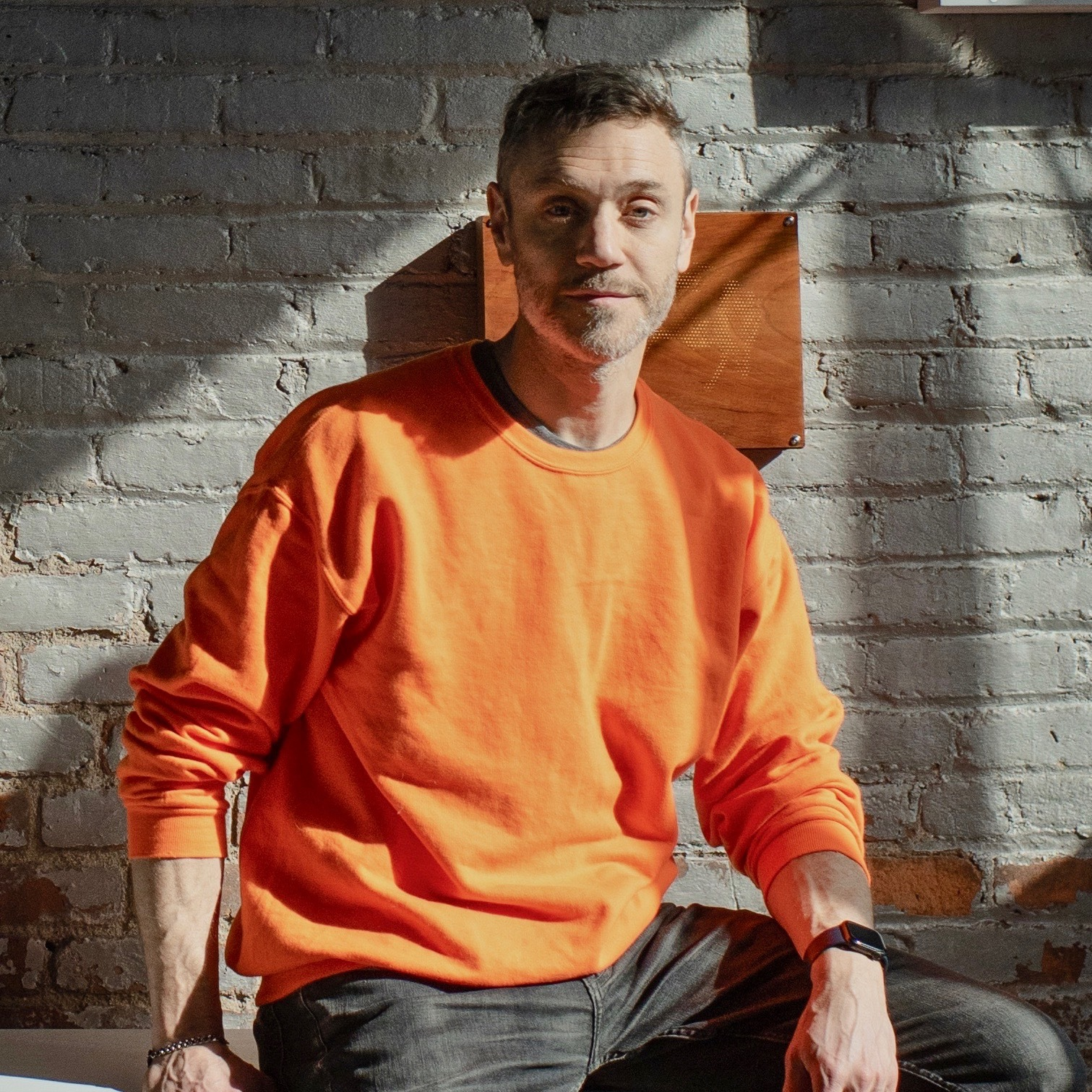
- Born: November 4, 1973 (age 52); Philadelphia, PA
- Education: ITP, Tisch School of the Arts, New York University; Vassar College
- Known for: Artist; Head of Innovation at the Interaction Design MFA program at SVA.
- Website: www.ericforman.com

Eric Forman is a New York-based artist and designer best known for his signal blocking chandelier sculpture Dis/Connect (2021), his installation Heart Squared (2020) in collaboration with MODU, and his sound object TreeShell (2013). Dis/Connect was featured as one of Fast Company's 2021 World Changing Ideas. Heart Squared was selected by the Cooper Hewitt, Smithsonian Design Museum as the winner of the Times Square Heart 2020 Design Competition. Throughout February 2020, Heart Squared was seen by over 300,000 people a day. TreeShell was selected by the Museum of Modern Art Design Store for its 2013 “Destination: NYC” series.

== Biography ==
Eric Forman received his B.A. from Vassar College in 1995, where he created his own course of study in “The Philosophical Ramifications of Computer Technology.” His studies culminated in a thesis titled “Virtual Reality: The Refiguring of Space, Real, and Subject”(1995), which investigated the conceptual impact of VR on media theory and philosophy. In the mid-1990s, he was one of the early members of Pseudo Programs, one of the world's original online streaming content services, where he worked on creating virtual environments for the early internet service provider Prodigy. Forman received his master's degree from ITP at Tisch School of the Arts (NYU) in 2002.

Eric Forman Studio was founded in 2003 and has produced primarily sculpture and installation art concerned with the intersection of technology and human, using “playful interaction to reveal issues of language, simulation, and perception.” In 2012, his studio became a founding member of New Lab at the Brooklyn Navy Yard.

Forman has also taught “Physical Computing” to artists and designers since 2003. He has taught at SIGGRAPH, RISD (Rhode Island School of Design) MFA Digital+Media, and SVA (School of Visual Arts) in New York City, where he is currently the Head of Innovation in the MFA Interaction Design department.

== Selected achievements ==
Achievement	Location	Year
Fast Company World Changing Ideas Awards 2021 Honorable Mention	New York, NY	2021
Times Square Heart 2020 Design Winner	New York, NY	2019
Invited to present retrospective on career	University of Delaware Department of Art & Design	2018
Træna artist residency	Tenk Træna, Nordland, Norway	2016
Autodesk Pier 9 artist residency	San Francisco, CA	2014-2015
Jerome Fellowship and Franconia Sculpture Park artist residency	Shafer, MN	2014
Spotlight Series Visiting Artist lecture	University of the Arts, Philadelphia, PA Spring	2013
Selected for MoMA Design Destination: NYC collection	New York, NY and Tokyo, Japan	2013
Invited speaker for “Creativity and Innovation” panel	CreateTech, Brooklyn, NY	2013
Invited by New York City EDC to present artwork made locally with new technologies	NY Design Week, BMWi Ventures, New York, NY	2012
Invited to present work and participate in panel “Slowness: Responding to Acceleration”	ISEA (International Symposium on Electronic Art), Istanbul, Turkey	2011
Toyota HEYA Artist Innovation Grant	New York, NY	2008

== Selected exhibitions and works ==
Work	Place	Year
Dis/Connect	New York, NY	2021
Heart Squared (with MODU)	Times Square, New York, NY	2020
UnBuilding	Citygroup Gallery, New York, NY and New Lab, Brooklyn, NY	2019
Un-Urban Experiment	DOGA (Design & Architecture Norway)	2018
Under Dytte Lyset [Under This Light]	Bodø Biennial, Norway	2016
Sculptural Light Installation	Motherboard New York, Brooklyn, NY	2016
Radiolarian	Sunsychronous orbit around Earth	2015
Auto-Surveillance Encounter II	Art Souterrain, Montreal, Canada	2015
Scale/Scape Light Panel series II	Autodesk Pier 9 Gallery, San Francisco, CA	2015
Radioscape	Franconia Sculpture Park, Shafer, MN	2014
Futur Absolu (with Stephan Breuer)	Château de Compiègne, Oise, France	2013
Consensual Navigation Shirt	Conflux Festival, New York, NY, part of “Test Dérive” curated by Seth Carnes	2010
Constrained Flight Structure	Solar One, New York, NY	2010
What the Rain has Seen	DUMBO Art Under the Bridge Festival, New York, NY	2008
Untitled (performance)	24HrsNonStopArt, Tigh Fili Cultural Centre, Cork, Ireland	2008
Every Drop Counts (with Cynthia Lawson)	Exit Art, New York, NY	2006
Auto-Surveillance Encounter	Show & Tell Salon curated by Leejone Wong, New York, NY	2004
Autonomous Harmonizing Robotic Sculpture	The New Museum of Contemporary Art, New York, NY	2003
branch/ing	Thomas Street Gallery, New York, NY	2002
Drop	ITP/Tisch, New York, NY	2002
TransLink	ITP/Tisch, New York, NY	2001
SoundBot	ITP/Tisch, New York, NY	2000

== Other professional work ==
Eric Forman Studio also develops interactive technology for clients, most notably Marina Abromovic, Anthony McCall, Line Healthcare, Kate Spade, and The Living.
