= David Belt =

American businessman

- Born: June 29, 1967 (age 59); Trenton, New Jersey, U.S.
- Education: George School
- Known for: Real estate development

David Eric Belt (born June 29, 1967) is an American-born entrepreneur, founder, and investor. He was voted one of the top 50 most powerful people in tech in New York City in 2019 by City & State and one of the top 100 most influential people in Brooklyn by Brooklyn Magazine. He is the founder of Macro Sea, the co-founder and Executive Chairman of Newlab, and the founder DBI, which now operates as two companies: DBI Projects and DBI Construction Consultants.

== Early life ==
Belt was born in 1967 in Trenton, New Jersey, and grew up in Yardley, Pennsylvania, a suburb of Philadelphia. He is the oldest of two children. Belt attended grade school in Bucks County, Pennsylvania and later the George School.

== Career ==
Belt moved to San Francisco in the 1980s while on tour with a punk band. He began his construction career in San Francisco working as a laborer. He transitioned to project management, running large projects including a $1 billion project at San Francisco International Airport. In 1999, Belt returned to the East Coast.

=== Macro Sea ===
In 2009, Belt started Macro Sea, a New York-based real estate development firm. Macro Sea is known for developing projects that convert or repurpose unused space into educational, arts or retail space, as well as residential buildings, student housing, and cultural centers, such as Newlab, in the Brooklyn Navy Yard. The company's endeavors are typically collaborative in nature, and its "Dumpster Pools" and Glassphemy! projects were highly publicized. According to its website, Macro Sea serves "as the entrepreneurial framework for most of David Belt’s development pursuits."

=== Dumpster Pools ===
Macro Sea's 2009-2010 mobile pool project, sometimes referred to as the "Dumpster Pools," was one of the first projects the firm undertook and served as a "way to experiment with underused space and materials, repurposing them with urban renewal in mind." Belt, with collaborators Jocko Weyland and Alix Feinkind, used the idea as a "template for a larger idea: turning eyesore strip malls into artsy community destinations, with Dumpster Pools and other indie attractions."

In 2010, the Bloomberg Administration and the Department of Transportation invited Macro Sea to participate in NYC’s Annual Summer Streets event. The pools were set up at the Park Avenue Viaduct, on the east side of Park Avenue between 40th and 41st Streets, for three Saturdays in August 2010.

=== Glassphemy! ===
In 2010, Belt created Glassphemy!, an eco-friendly psychological recycling experiment intended to reinvigorate the recycling process. The installation was set along the Gowanus Canal in Brooklyn, and included a 20-foot-by-30-foot clear box with high steel walls and bulletproof glass, at which participants threw and smashed bottles. Shards of collected glass were then recycled onsite. In 2013, Glassphemy! was featured in MoMa’s Design and Violence Exhibition.

=== G27 Global Institute ===
In 2014, Macro Sea and its sister firm DBI Projects began construction to convert the Roka manufacturing complex in Berlin, Germany, into a "design-centric residence for students living abroad." Macro Sea partnered with the Council on International Educational Exchange (CIEE) for the project; construction was completed in 2015. The 85,000-square foot complex is located at 27 Gneisenaustrasse includes "administrative offices and faculty apartments, and a large six-story factory building set back from the street and separated by a magnificent tree-lined interior courtyard."

=== Newlab ===
Belt is the co-founder and Chairman of Newlab, an interdisciplinary space designed to support entrepreneurs working in emerging technologies, and a resource for tech, hardware, and new manufacturing in New York City. Based in the Brooklyn Navy Yard, Newlab supports over 70 companies in a variety of fields—including robotics, A.I., urban technology, and energy—with the goal of encouraging cross-discipline collaboration. The space is a public-private partnership with the City of New York, which invested to revitalize the Brooklyn Navy Yard.

=== DBI Projects ===
In 2002, Belt formed DBI Construction Consultants. In 2008, he partnered with two long-time employees, Dennis Di Millo and Ofer Ohad, who now run two branches of the company. The company has two main practices: a project management and development arm run by Ohad, and a consulting division run by Di Millo. DBI has worked on projects and consulting assignments throughout the U.S., Europe and the Middle East. DBI Projects was formed as a sister developing company in 2015, and is acting as construction project manager for the World Trade Center Performing Arts Center, several charter school projects, and recently completed the transformation of St. Ann's Warehouse, an 1860 tobacco warehouse beneath the Brooklyn Bridge in DUMBO, into a non-profit performing arts institution.

== Philanthropy ==
Belt has donated consulting services and intellectual capital related to the build-out of nonprofit facilities throughout NYC through the Robin Hood Foundation. He also serves on the board of Pioneer Works and St. Ann’s Warehouse.

== Personal life ==
Belt lives in Brooklyn, New York.
