= Pioneer Works =

Cultural arts center in New York City

Coordinates: 40.679235°N 74.0122°W

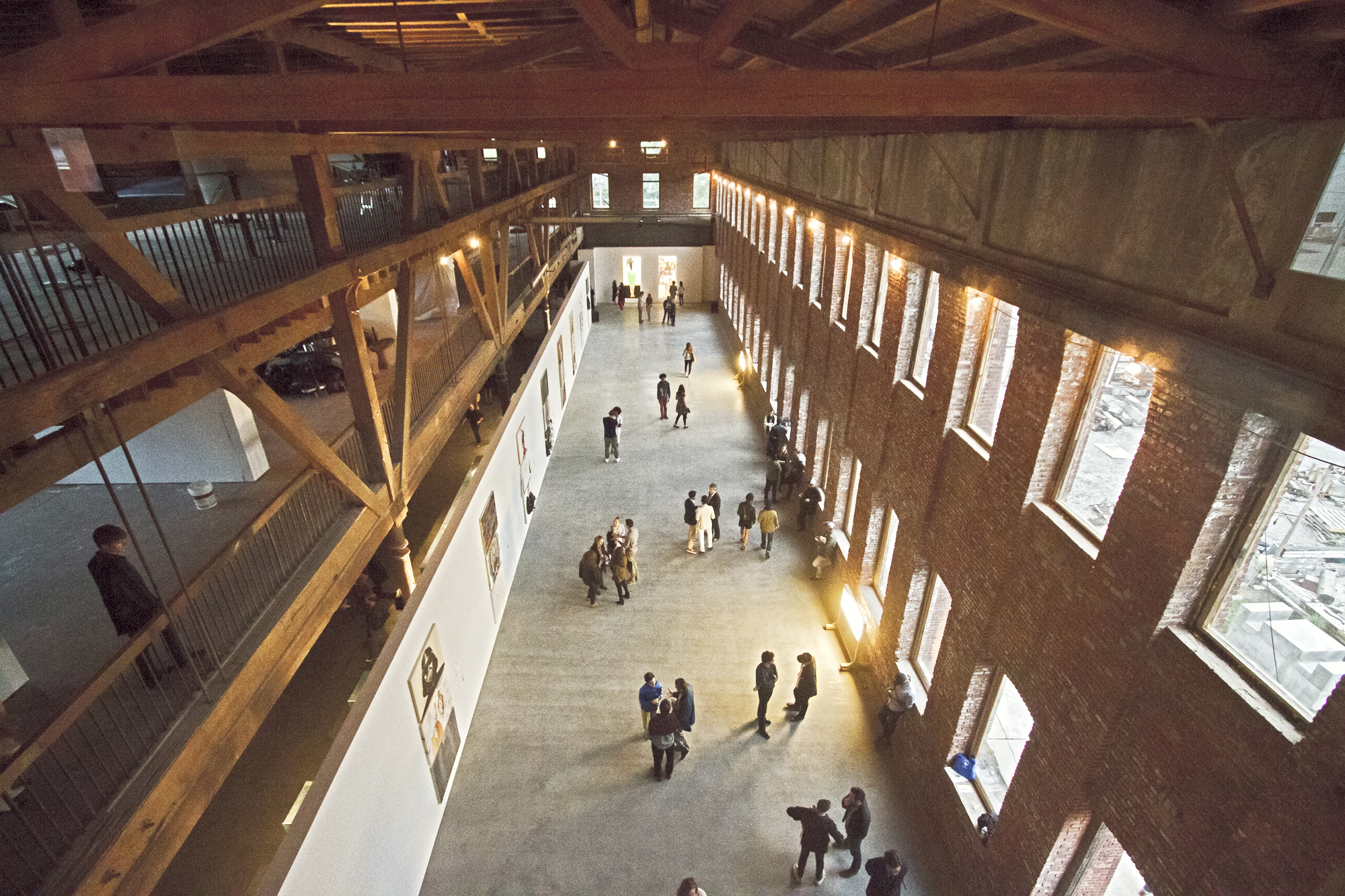
- The main hall at Pioneer Works, which hosts art exhibitions and large scale concerts and events.
- Formation: 2012
- Founder: Dustin Yellin
- Location: Red Hook, Brooklyn, New York City
- Website: www.pioneerworks.org

Pioneer Works is a nonprofit cultural arts center in the Red Hook neighborhood of Brooklyn, New York City. It was founded by the artist Dustin Yellin in 2012.

Pioneer Works includes a large exhibition space, a garden, an artist-in-residency program, a class and lecture series, and a press, and "aim[s] to foster innovation in the performing and visual arts, music and science."

== History ==
Previously, a red brick warehouse building housed Pioneer Iron Works. Built in 1866 and located a few blocks from Red Hook's piers, Pioneer Iron Works was owned by Alexander Bass, a sugar magnate in the Caribbean whose factory manufactured steamrollers, railroad tracks, and machinery used to refine sugar in Cuba and on other islands. Alexander Bass's son, William L. Bass, was a key figure in developing the sugar trade in the Dominican Republic, and also published several books on astronomy. The Bass family's factory became a local landmark after which Pioneer Street was named. Pioneer Iron Works remained in active use through World War II, and was used for several decades thereafter as a warehouse.

Constructed in 1866 to house Pioneer Iron Works, the building was originally a factory for constructing large scale machines, including railroad tracks and machinery for sugar plantations. The building was burned to the ground by a fire in 1881 and rebuilt shortly thereafter.

The building's current incarnation as Pioneer Works entailed extensive renovations to shape its new life as a cultural center. Pioneer Works has been noted for its adaptive reuse of its brick-and-mortar home as a demonstration of the organization's focus on sustainability and reviving historic spaces.

Artist Dustin Yellin purchased the colossal brick building in 2011 for $3.7 million. Yellin's cousin Gabriel Florenz became the institution's founding artistic director, and Sam Trimble served as lead architect for a 2011 renovation that added 100 windows.

Gabriel Florenz, PW's Founding Artistic and executive director, played a central role in establishing the nonprofit and shaping its artistic and programmatic vision. Working alongside a group of artists, supporters, and advisors, he led the renovation of the historic structure and helped launch Pioneer Works.

Yellin initially named the space "Intercourse," and it opened its doors to the public in 2012.

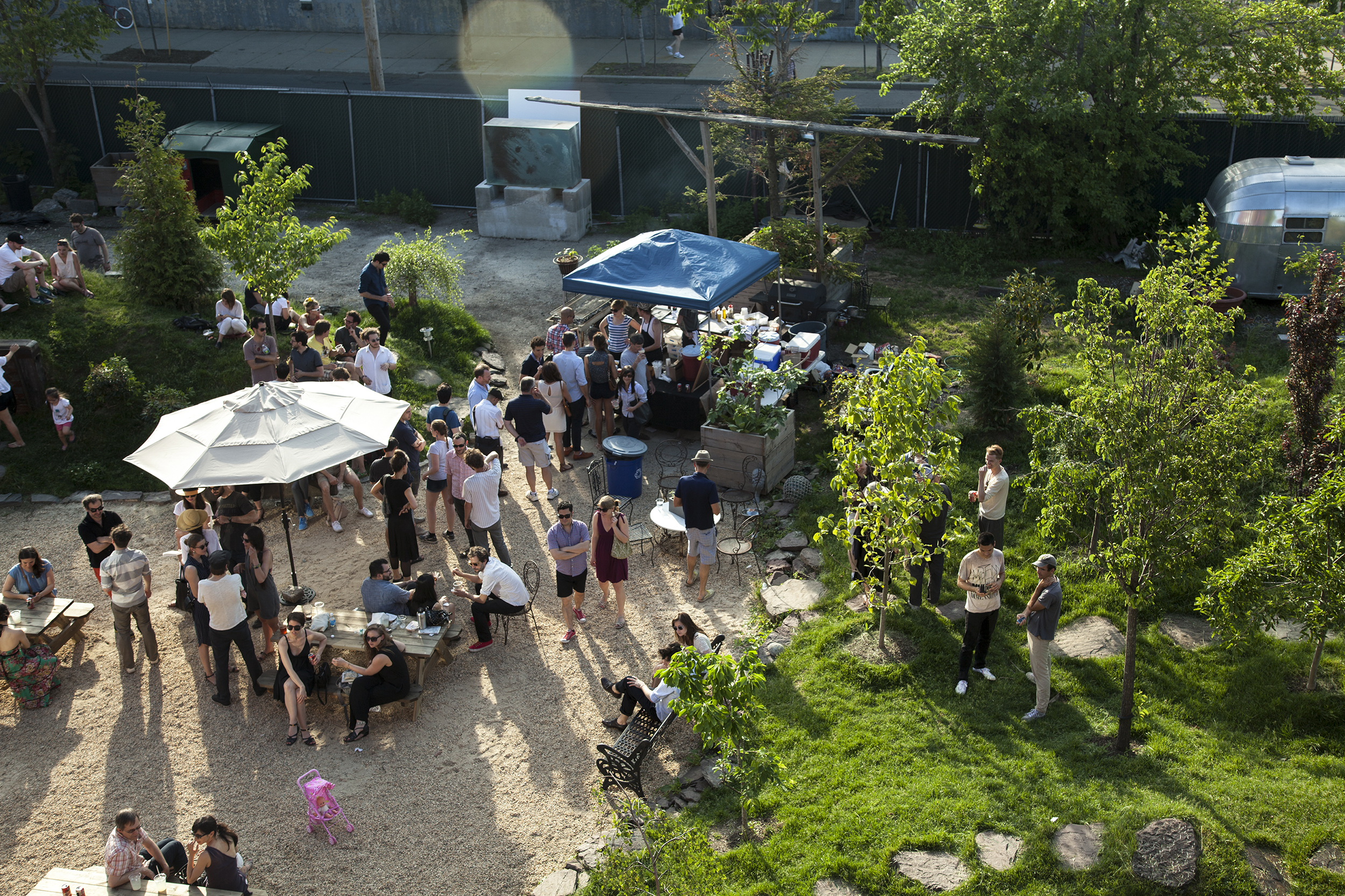
The garden at Pioneer Works.

Months after much of the initial restoration was completed, Hurricane Sandy caused severe flooding and damage to the neighborhood. Five feet of water flooded the space, severely damaging the ground floor; many of those living and working nearby suffered extensive losses from the storm, and the building's reconstruction had to be started over.

Following extensive cleanup and renovations, the space re-opened in 2013 under the name Pioneer Works.

In 2014, Janna Levin, a Columbia University astrophysicist and author, joined as the organization's Founding Director of Sciences.

== Program initiatives ==
=== Exhibitions and events ===
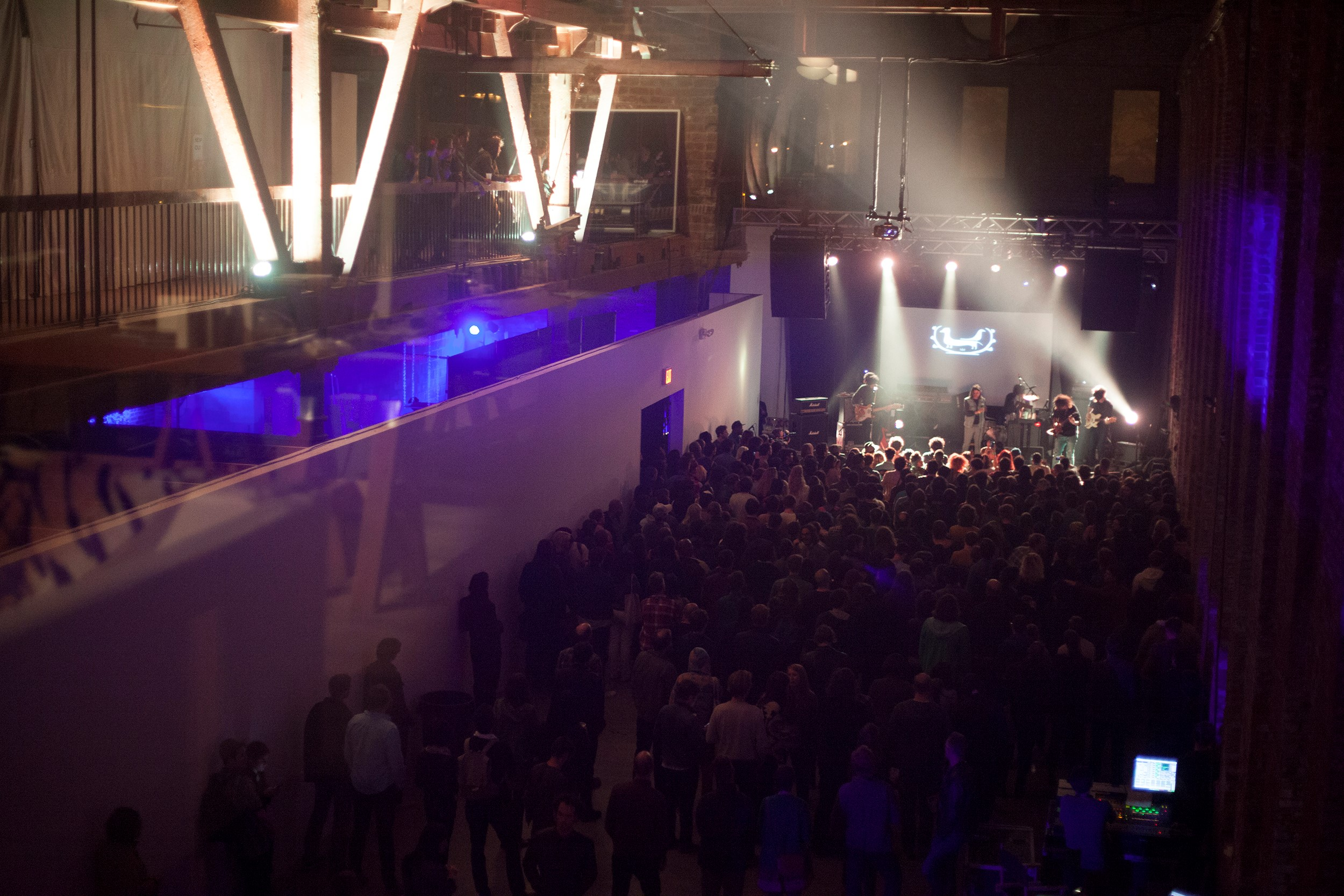
Musician Ariel Pink performs for several hundred people during the Mexican Summer Weekend Festival, a collaboration between an independent record label and Pioneer Works.

Specialists from diverse backgrounds present work in a number of different ways, from traditional lectures to films to art installations and performances. The exhibition program revolves around an expansive, main space that acts as a major exhibit hall. Musical performances are frequent and range from single performances to festivals.

=== Residencies ===
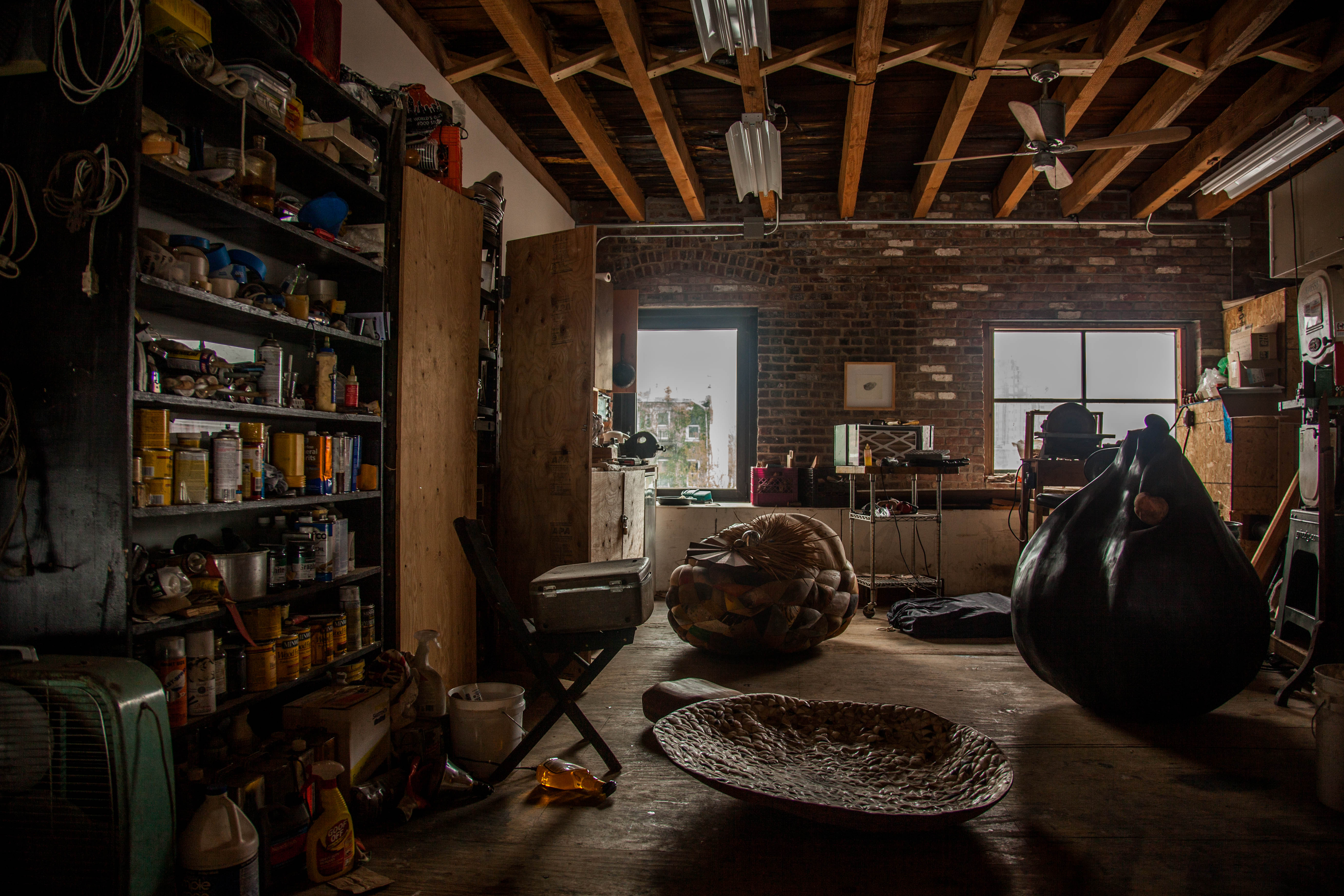
Former-resident woodworker Thomas Beale's studio.

Housed within the facility, the residency program facilities include a 3D printer, a powerful microscope capable of printing the viewed image, a metalworking shop, a woodworking shop, an analog photography studio, and a music studio. Visual and performing artists, writers, musicians, designers, and scientists are encouraged to share their ideas in a public presentation of the work produced over the course of the residency.

=== Educational classes ===
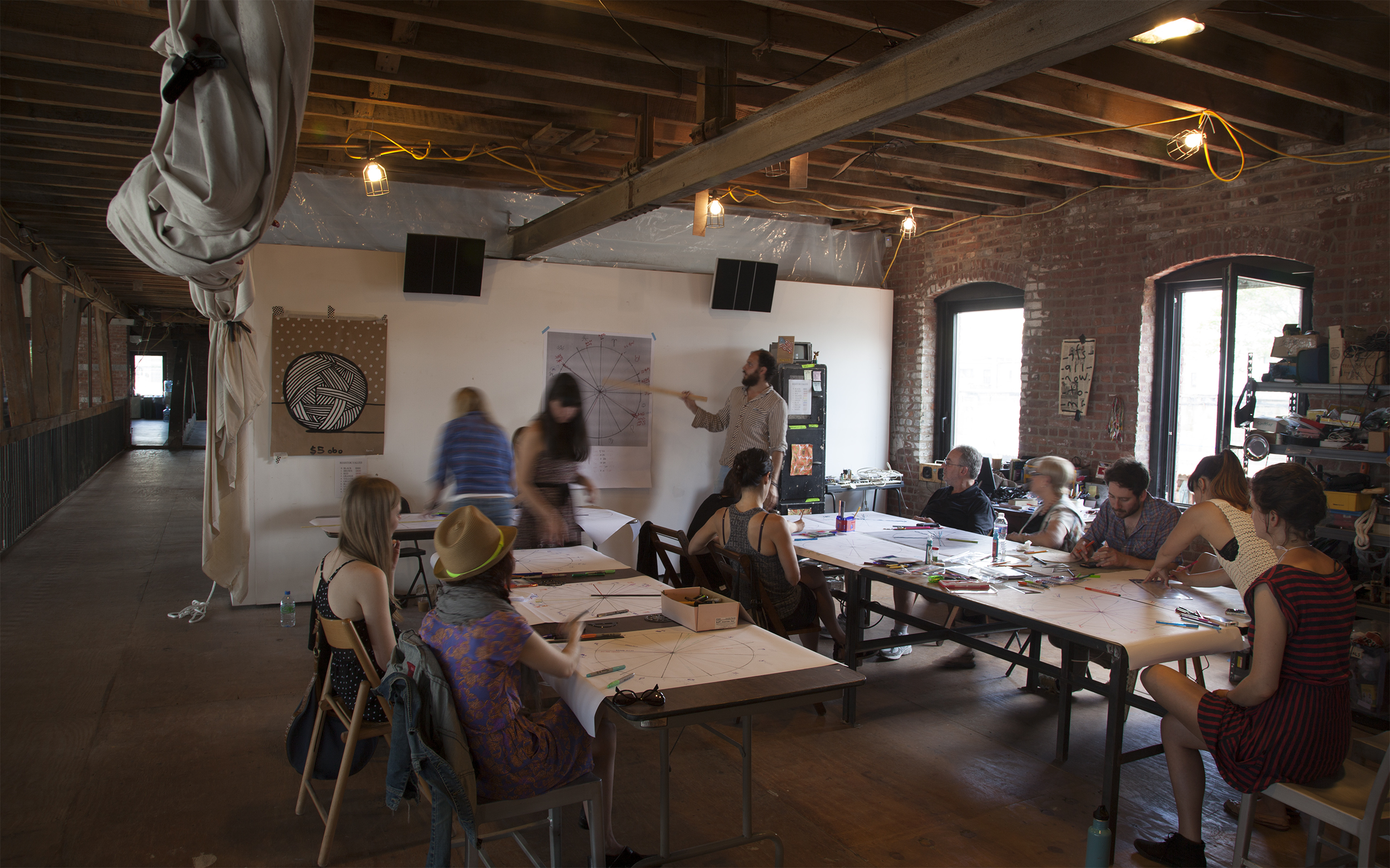
Former-resident Joey Frank elaborates upon his theories of astrology in one of several classrooms.

Although the fields of the arts and sciences are prevalent, courses range from circuitry design to specialized courses like lock-picking and advice on how to fake one's own death.

Nano-physicist Matthew Putman led the creation of the Pioneer Works science program, which aims to dismantle institutional barriers between the arts and sciences and to fuse technology, imagination, and experimental rigor. The Science Studios invites scientific minds to explore unsolved quandaries and to engage in public discourse. The Scientific Controversies program has hosted geneticist George Church, oncologist Sidhartha Mukarjee, Nobel Prize winner Rainer Weiss, and evolutionary biologist Richard Dawkins. The program also provides Ph.D. researchers, programmers, physicists, biologists, and chemists with equipment for experimentation.

=== Publications ===
The nonprofit acts as a publisher through the imprint Pioneer Works Press and publishes an online magazine called Broadcast.
