= Matthew Putman (scientist) =

Matthew Putman is an American scientist, educator, musician, and film and stage producer. He is best known for his work in nanotechnology, the science of working in dimensions smaller than 100 nanometers. Putman is the CEO of Nanotronics Imaging, an advanced machines and intelligence company.

== Career ==
After receiving a B.A. in Music and Theater from Baldwin-Wallace University in Ohio, Putman worked as Vice President of Development for Tech Pro, Inc., a business launched by his parents, Kay and John Putman, in 1982. He later received a PhD in Applied Mathematics and Physics, and was a professor and researcher.

Tech-Pro was acquired by Roper Industries in March 2008. That same year, John and Matthew Putman founded Nanotronics Imaging, which includes Peter Thiel as the 3rd director on the Board.

Putman has published over 30 papers and is an inventor on over 50 patent applications filed in the U.S. and other countries. He is also a founding member of The Quantum Industry Coalition. He has lectured at the University of Paris, USC, University of Michigan, and The Technical University of São Paulo.

Along with his scientific and engineering work, Matthew Putman has produced several plays and films. Putman is an Artist-in-Residence for Imagine Science Films, which seeks to build relationships between scientists and filmmakers. He most recently produced the film Son of Monarchs, which premiered at Sundance in February 2021 and was awarded the Sloane Prize. He also published a book of poems, Magnificent Chaos, partly written during his battle with esophagal cancer in 2005 (AuthorHouse, 2011).

A jazz pianist and composer, he appears on the CDs Perennial (2008), Gowanus Recordings (577 Records, 2009), and Telepathic Alliances (577 Records, 2017) and has played with jazz masters Ornette Coleman, Daniel Carter and Vijay Iyer. He has performed in several venues and festivals, including the Forward Festival. His most recent jazz album was released on in April 2021 with 577 records, featuring Michael Sarian.

Putman is on the Board of Directors of Pioneer Works and New York Live Arts.
