= Newlab =

Technology center in Brooklyn, New York

Coordinates: 40.69857°N 73.974551°W

- Company type: Tech Center
- Industry: Robotics, A.I., 3D Printing, Connected Devices, Energy, Nanotech, Life Sciences
- Founded: June 2016
- Founder: David Belt, Scott Cohen
- Headquarters: Brooklyn, NY, United States
- Area served: International
- Key people: David Belt, Scott Cohen, Shaun Stewart
- Number of employees: 20 - 30
- Parent: Newlab, LLC
- Website: newlab.com

Newlab opened in June 2016, as a multi-disciplinary technology center. Housed in Building 128 of the Brooklyn Navy Yard, the $35 million project serves as a hardware-focused shared workspace, research lab, and hatchery for socially oriented tech manufacturing.

Using the MIT Media Lab as a model, the impetus for the independent organization was to provide space and services to new manufacturing enterprises. Current members work in fields such as robotics, connected devices, energy, nanotechnology, life sciences, and urban tech.

Media coverage of Newlab has focused on the company's role in revitalizing the Brooklyn Navy Yard, its public-private partnership lease structure, and Urban Tech initiative with the New York City Economic Development Corporation.

== History and formation ==
David Belt and partner Scott Cohen formed the concept for Newlab in 2011 after prospecting the decaying Building 128 with Navy Yard president David Ehrenberg. The partners found the maritime manufacturing history of the structure, specifically the manufacturing innovations that took place there, synchronous with their aim to provide a platform for emerging hardware technologies in New York City. The city was abundant in resources and opportunities for entrepreneurs working in software, Belt said in a recent interview, but space, tools and resources for those working in the new manufacturing hardware community were lacking.

Belt leveraged his development firm, Macro Sea, a company that specializes "in bringing historic properties back into cultural relevance," to obtain funding, architectural expertise, and begin constructing a lease with the city of New York. The Navy Yard was in the initial stages of its current revitalization at the time and, because the city owned the property, special arrangements were needed to develop there.

Cohen began scouting the companies who would comprise their core members and helped work to capitalize them. To date, venture capitalists have invested approximately $250 million in Newlab and its members.

== Historical significance of Building 128 ==
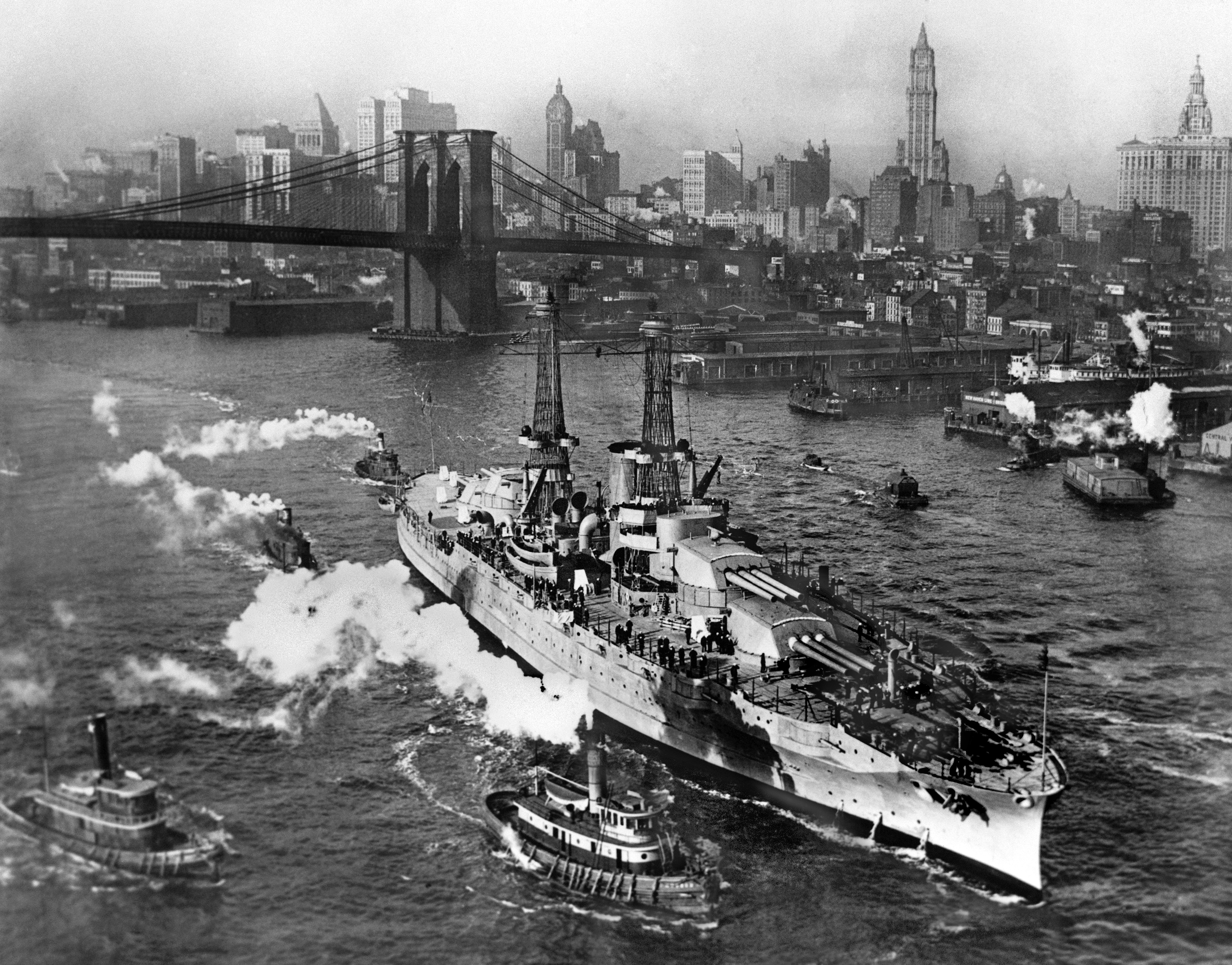
Pieces of the USS Arizona were machined in Building 128. The ship is shown heading back to the yard after sea trials.

=== Lineage of the site ===
The land predating Newlab has a rich historical cultural lineage and narrative of experimental and innovative breakthroughs. That past was a major factor in the decision to develop Newlab in the Navy Yard. Before colonial settlement, the area that would become the Navy Yard served as a clamming site for the Lenape Native Americans. It was then settled by the Dutch and sold to a developer, thus beginning its employment as a center for manufacturing. Among the technological advancements that took place at the Navy Yard are: the first use of the steam-powered pile driver; construction of the first undersea telegraph cable; development of a commercialized form of anesthetic ether by E.R. Squibb; and a broadcast of the first person to sing over the radio, Eugenia Farrar performing "I Love You Truly", was heard at the yard in 1907.

Construction of navy ships like the Fulton II, a first-of-its-kind steam-powered warship, and fabrication of the USS Arizona, state-of-the-art among its peers, induced many influential manufacturing process refinements and advancements.

In interviews, Belt and Cohen both cite this maritime and technological history as inspiration for Newlab, both in guiding the renovation of the facility and in shaping its mission.

=== Building 128 ===
According to a Brooklyn Navy Yard Development Corporation document, 128 was raised in 1899 as a "steel structure... used to assemble large boiler engines and fabricated sections of naval vessels." It served as the primary machine shop for every major ship launched during World Wars One and Two. Designed to accommodate the significant height of a warship, the sequence of its hulking steel girders resembles an airport hangar. 128 has been slated for, but avoided, plans for non-naval readaptation. The City of New York sought to adapt it for reuse as a "food complex at one point," but the effort was not sustained.

=== Renovation and architecture ===
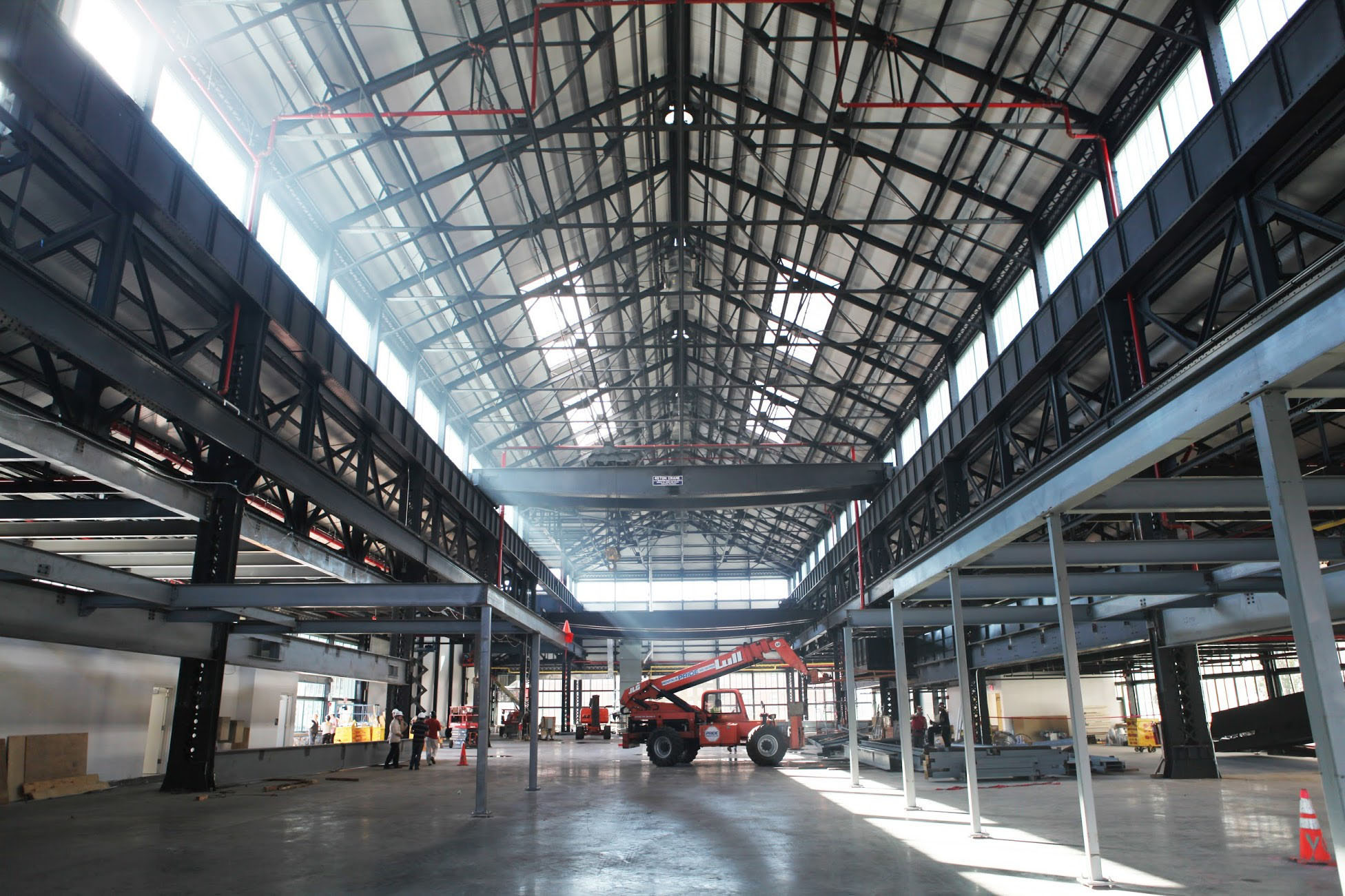
August 31, 2015, photo of Brooklyn Navy Yard Building 128 in the later stages of renovation for Newlab

Marvel Architects, Newlab's architect of record, along with DBI Projects, Belt's project management firm, worked together to craft and execute the renovation. Press regarding Newlab often states that the company occupies Building 128 of the Navy Yard, but this is slightly misleading in that 128 is a complex of warehouses and Newlab occupies the southernmost portion.

Recladding the building's armature and repurposing of the 51,000 ft^{2} machine shop into an 84,000 ft^{2} multidisciplinary design, prototyping, and advanced manufacturing space took approximately 5 years and continued until the company's full opening in September 2016. The undertaking utilized approximately 9,000 lbs of steel in total according to the developer.

A guiding principle of the redesign was to harmonize the needs of the forthcoming lab environment with the original structural features. Modern workplace design elements were fused with the 19th century industrial characteristics of the building's centerline.

=== Floor plan ===
Newlab's open floor design was intended, spatially, to reinforce its mission, the layout meant to encourage member companies to collaborate and cross-pollinate ideas. Communal meeting rooms, office pods, and interior plazas on both floors emphasize the developer's intention to create a collaborative design and fabrication center.

Upon completion, the rebuild subdivided Building 128's usable space into: Private studios = 31,664 ft^{2}; Open private studios = 6,226 ft^{2}; Fabrication lab = 6,834 ft^{2}; Cafe kitchen = 600 ft^{2}; Conference rooms = 2,014 ft^{2}; Coworking desks = 144; Flex space = 66 desks.

There is an additional 6,174 ft^{2} of event space which hosts talks, hackathons, and new manufacturing events such as the recent Urban Tech Hub launch.

== Prototyping and fabrication lab ==
Additive manufacturing (3D printing) technology is a component of the design process for many Newlab residents. Prototyping shops are a distinguishing feature of the hardware-centric facility. Newlab leverages partnerships with firms like AutoDesk, Stratasys, BigRep, Haas, Ultimaker, and others to provide and maintain equipment and filament for printing. The organization has amassed several million dollars of digital fabrication and manufacturing machine assets such as 3D Printers, electronic workbenches, fabrication tools, and CNC equipment since its opening.

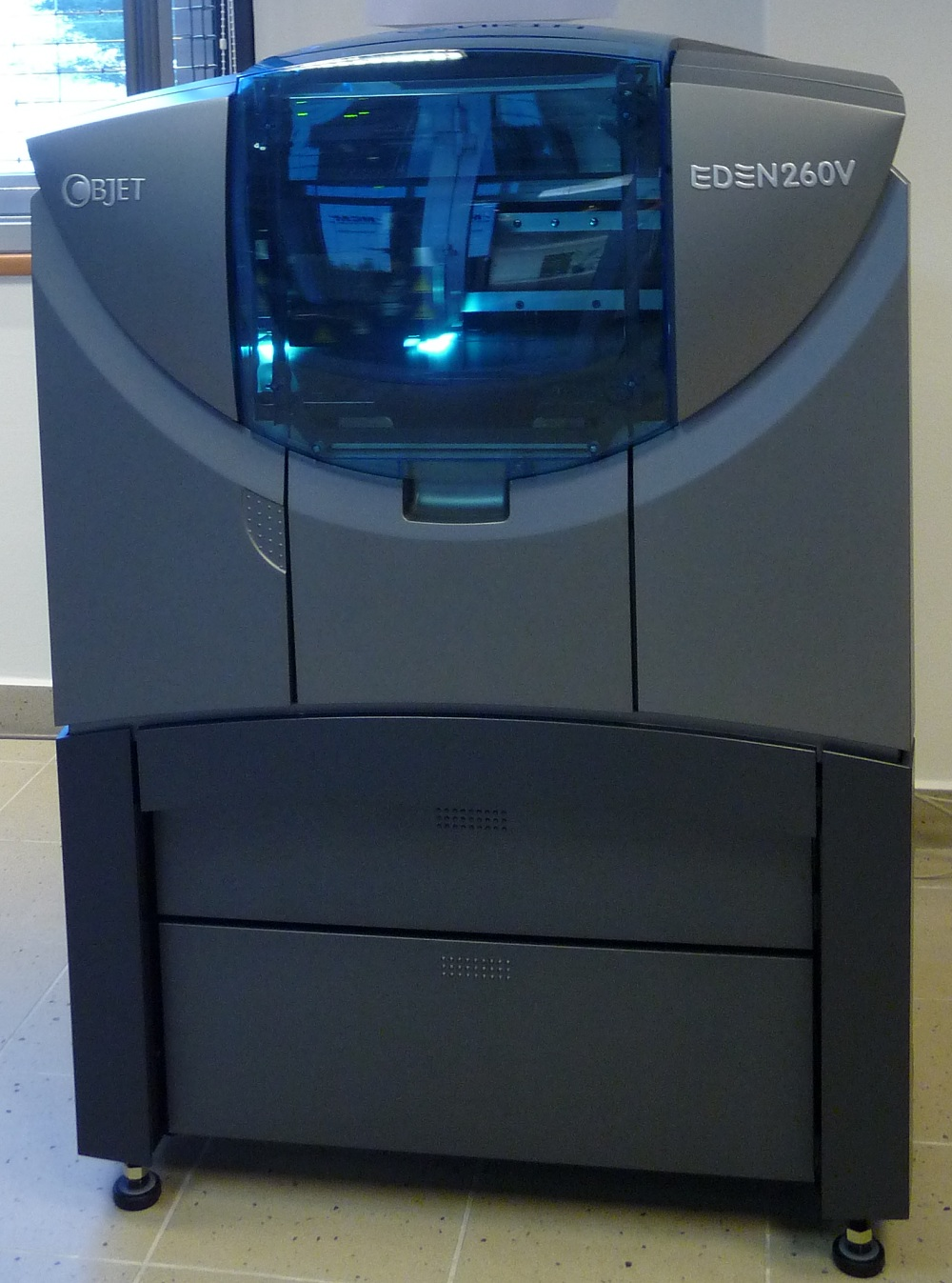
A Sratasys Objet Eden 260v 3D poly jet printer from 2015. While a predecessor to Newlab's Objet 30, it is indicative of the additive manufacturing technologies employed at Newlab's prototyping lab.

== Companies ==
As of September 2017 eighty companies and 400 people worked at Newlab. By 2018, the number of companies had increased to over 100. Members are typically growth-stage companies with anywhere between 3-20 employees.
