= Aaron Garber-Maikovska =

American artist

- Born: 1978; Washington, DC
- Education: BFA University of California, Los Angeles; MFA San Francisco Art Institute
- Known for: Painting, performance art

Aaron Garber-Maikovska (born 1978, Washington, DC) is a Los Angeles-based painter and performance artist. He has shown at the Smithsonian's Hirshhorn Museum and Sculpture Garden and his work is the collection of the Pérez Art Museum Miami, Florida, and the Walker Art Center, Minneapolis.

== Education and career ==
Aaron Garber-Maikovska holds a BFA from University of California, Los Angeles (2006) and an MFA from the San Francisco Art Institute (2000). His work encompasses painting, video, performance, and sculpture. While navigating different mediums, according to the artist, his performance practice informs his painting production.

His work has been featured in and reviewed by the New York Times Magazine, Contemporary Art Review LA, Artforum, and Time Out Magazine.

Garber-Maikovska's work is also included in the collections of the Los Angeles County Museum of Art; Hammer Museum, Los Angeles; Hirshhorn Museum and Sculpture Garden, Washington D.C.; Walker Art Center, Minneapolis; Fondation Louis Vuitton, Paris; Long Museum, Shanghai.
