= Adreon =

Adreon is both a surname and a given name. Notable people with the name include:

- Franklin Adreon (1902–1979), American film and television director, producer, screenwriter, and actor
- Adreon Henry (born 1975), American artist and musician
- Adreon P. Leipold, LL.M. (born 1990), German entrepreneur in technical contract management
