= Adreon Henry =

American painter

Adreon Denson Henry (born November 12, 1975) is an artist/musician that currently resides in Austin, Texas. Over the last seven years he has produced hundreds of paintings and shown work in over thirty exhibits (national and international). He has participated in various art and music residencies and produced an assortment of designs commissioned by international companies.

Henry's band, the trio known as Single Frame, has performed at the SXSW music festival.

== Education ==
Creative Advertising, University of Texas at Austin, B.S., 2002
