= Stanley Tomshinsky =

American painter (1935–2004)

Stanley Tomshinsky (1935–2004) was an American artist.

Stanley was born in New York City in 1935 in a Jewish family of Lettonian origin. After graduation he moved to Europe, choosing Paris as his destination. His first passion was sculpture, and he created abstract, surreal and Symbolic pieces, using mostly welded copper and iron. In 1966 he moved to Milan and decided to explore other media, turning to painting, oil and acrylic. Totems, figures, mythological creatures become the symbolic expression of the themes which were dear to his philosophical and spiritual research. He studied mathematics, colour and universal symbols. Tomshinsky travelled a lot, and exhibited his works in Paris, Milan, Vienna, Zürich, Düsseldorf, Brussels, London, and Rome.
