= List of American artists before 1900 =

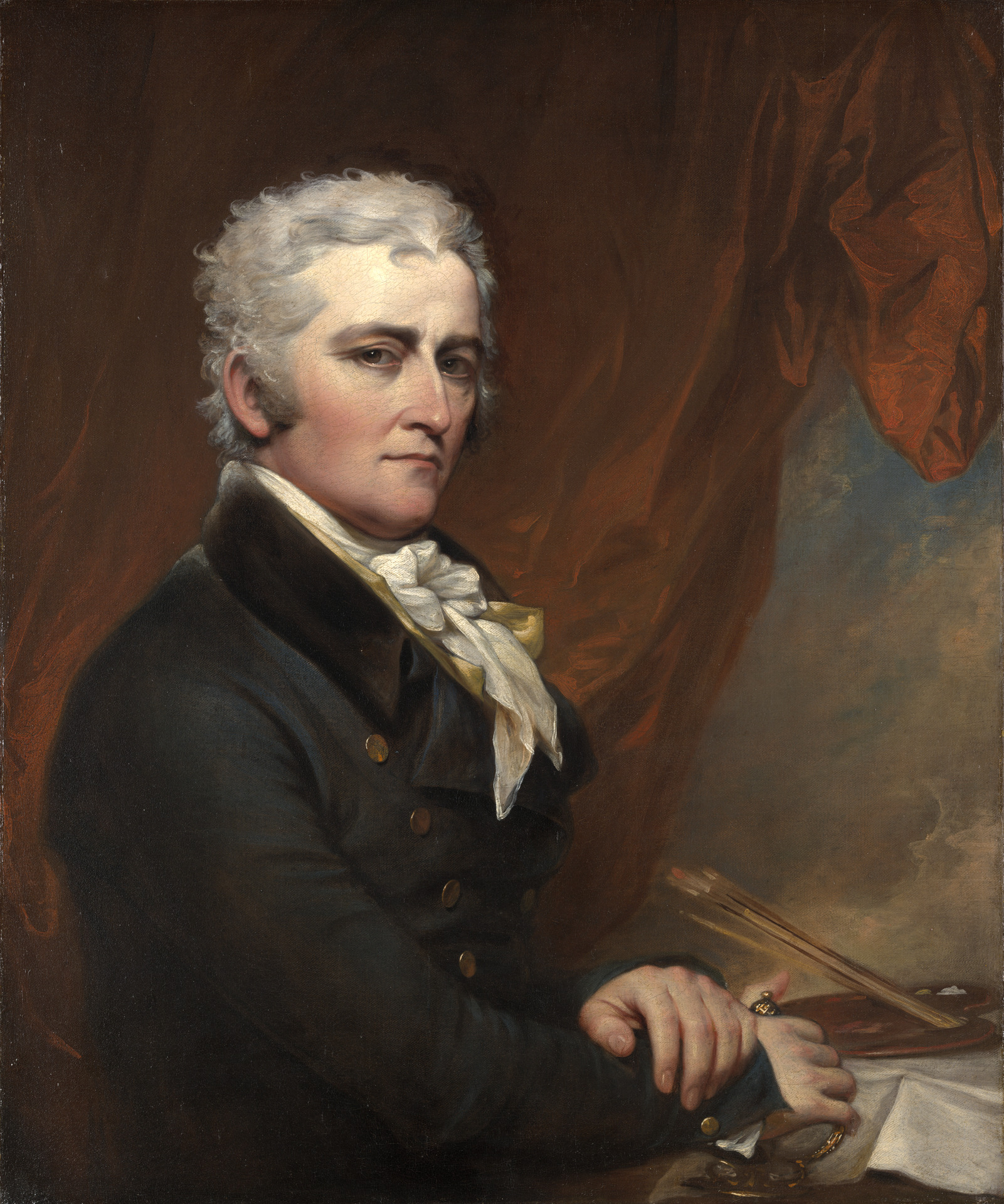
Self-portrait by John Trumbull (1756–1843), dubbed the "Painter of the Revolution", is well-known for his historical paintings of the American Revolution.

This is a list by date of birth of historically recognized American fine artists known for the creation of artworks that are primarily visual in nature, including traditional media such as painting, sculpture, photography, and printmaking.

== Born before 1800 ==
- John White (c. 1540 – c. 1606), artist-illustrator, surveyor

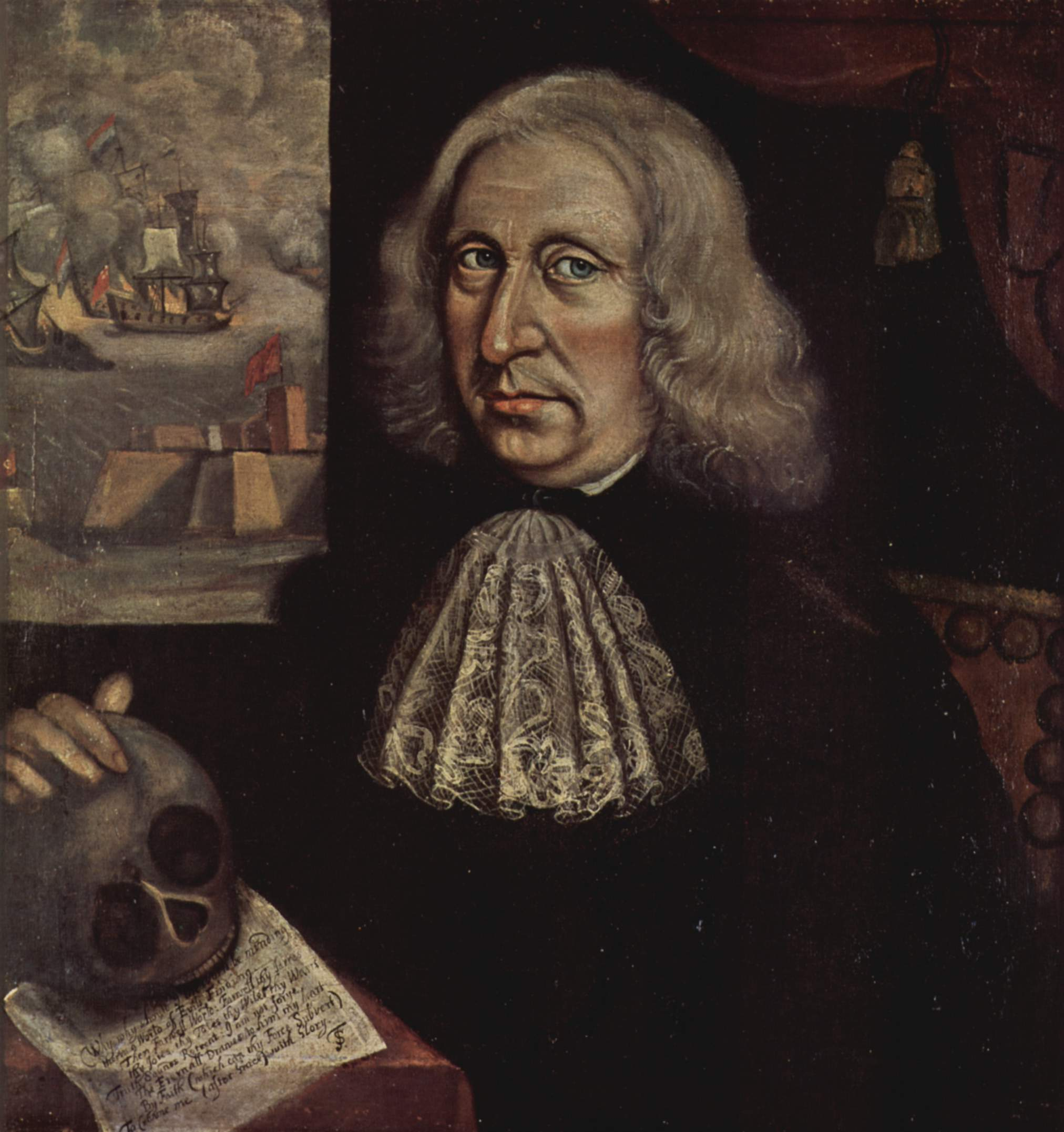
Thomas Smith (c. 1650 – c. 1691)

- Thomas Smith (c. 1650 – c. 1691), painter
- John Smybert (1688–1751), painter
- Robert Feke (c. 1705/1707–1750), painter
- Joseph Badger (c. 1707/1708–1765), painter
- Jeremiah Theus (1716–1774), painter
- Patience Wright (1725–1786), sculptor
- John Hesselius (1728–1778), painter
- John Singleton Copley (c. 1738–1815), painter
- Benjamin West (1738–1820), painter
- Charles Willson Peale (1741–1827), painter
- Henry Benbridge (1743–1812), painter
- James Peale (1749–1831), painter
- Ralph Earl (1751–1801), painter

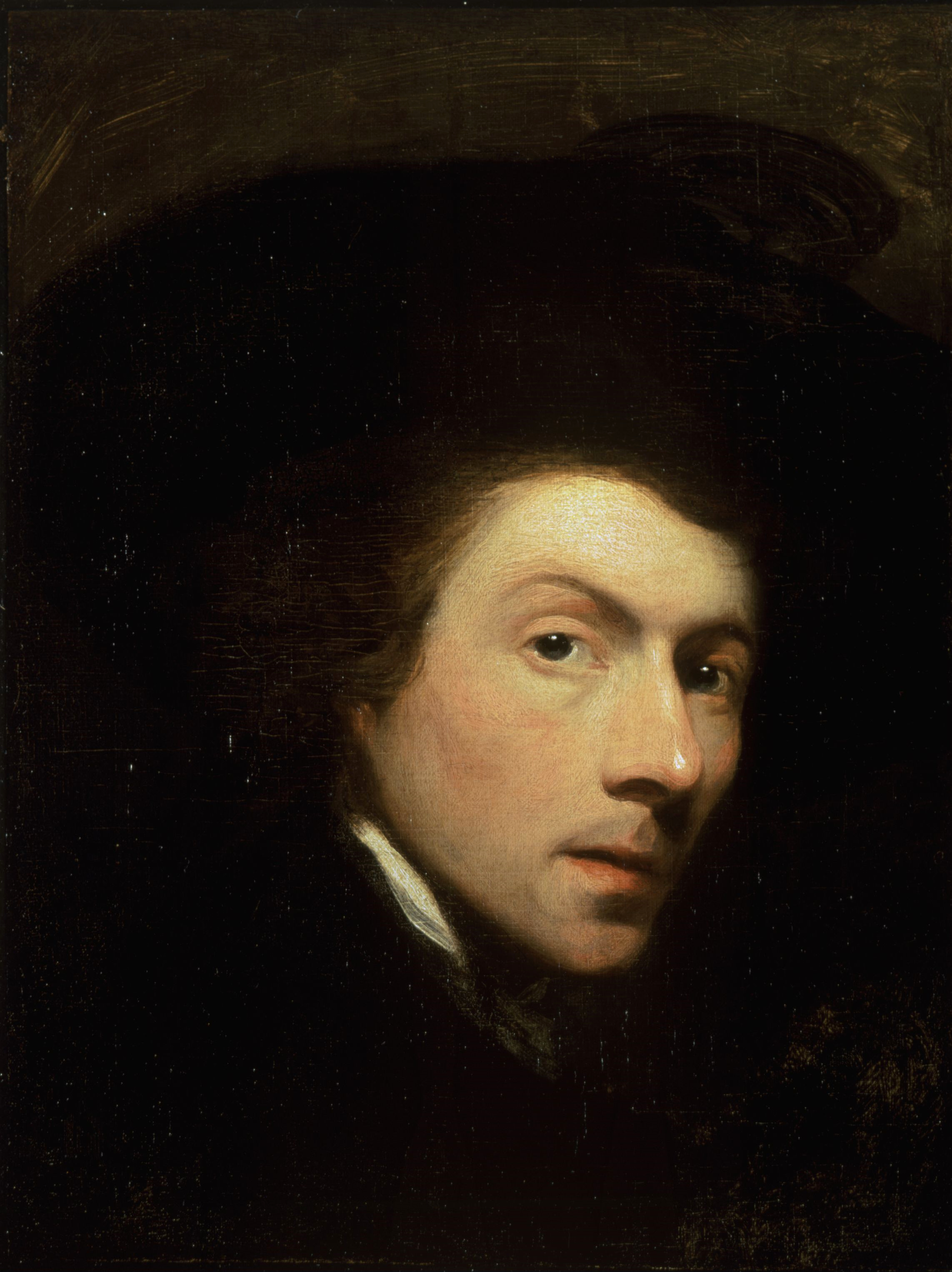
Gilbert Stuart (1755–1828)

- Gilbert Stuart (1755–1828), painter
- John Trumbull (1756–1843), painter
- William Rush (1756–1833), sculptor
- Christian Gullager (1759-1826), painter
- James Earl (1761–1796), painter
- Mather Brown (1761–1831), painter
- Edward Savage (1761–1817), painter
- John Brewster Jr. (1766–1854), painter
- Ruth Henshaw Bascom (1772–1848), folk art portraitist
- William Jennys (1774–1859), primitive portrait painter
- Raphaelle Peale (1774–1825), painter
- Cephas Thompson (1775–1856), portrait painter
- John Vanderlyn (1775–1852), painter
- Jacob Eichholtz (1776–1842), portrait painter
- Rembrandt Peale (1778–1860), painter
- Washington Allston (1779–1843), painter
- Edward Hicks (1780–1849), painter

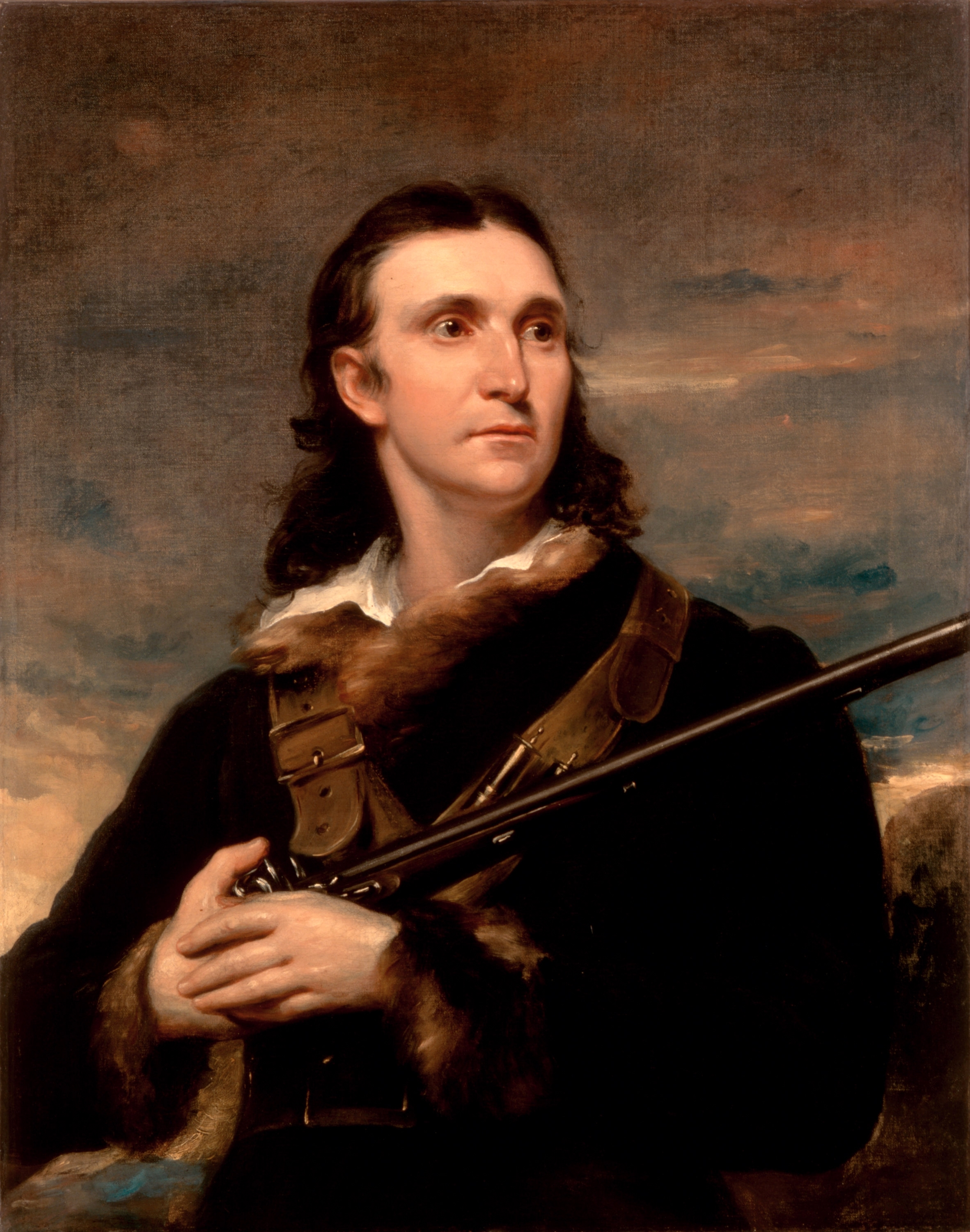
John James Audubon (1785–1851)

- John Wesley Jarvis (c. 1781–1839), painter
- Thomas Sully (1783–1872), painter
- Solomon Willard (1783–1861), stone carver
- Rubens Peale (1784–1865), painter
- Bass Otis (1784–1861), painter
- John James Audubon (1785–1851), painter of birds and nature
- Charles Bird King (1785–1862), portrait painter
- James Frothingham (1786–1864), painter
- John Lewis Krimmel (1786–1821), America's first genre painter
- William Edward West (1788–1859), portrait painter
- Hannah Cohoon (1788–1864), painter
- Sarah Goodridge (1788–1853), painter of miniatures
- Matthew Harris Jouett (1788–1827), portrait artist

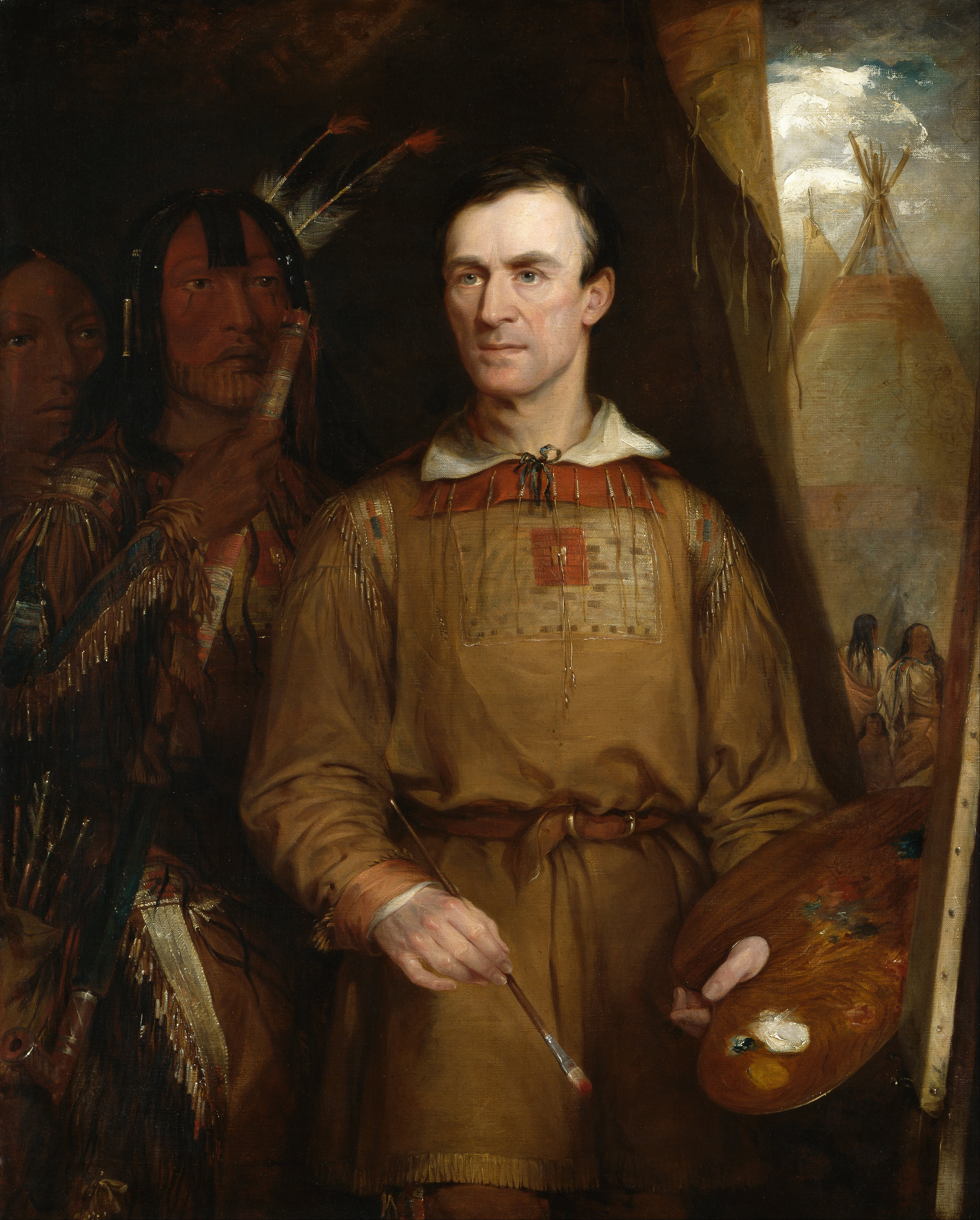
George Catlin (1796–1872)

- Hezekiah Augur (1791–1858), sculptor, inventor
- Samuel F. B. Morse (1791–1872), painter, inventor
- Susanna Paine (1792–1862), portrait artist
- Alvan Fisher (1792–1863), painter
- James Bowman (c. 1793–1842), painter
- Thomas Doughty (1793–1856), painter
- Amasa Hewins (1795–1855), painter
- George Catlin (1796–1872), painter
- Asher Durand (1796–1886), painter
- John Neagle (1796–1865), painter
- Elizabeth Goodridge (1798–1882), miniaturist painter
- Titian Peale (1799–1885), painter

== Born 1800–1809 ==
=== 1800 ===
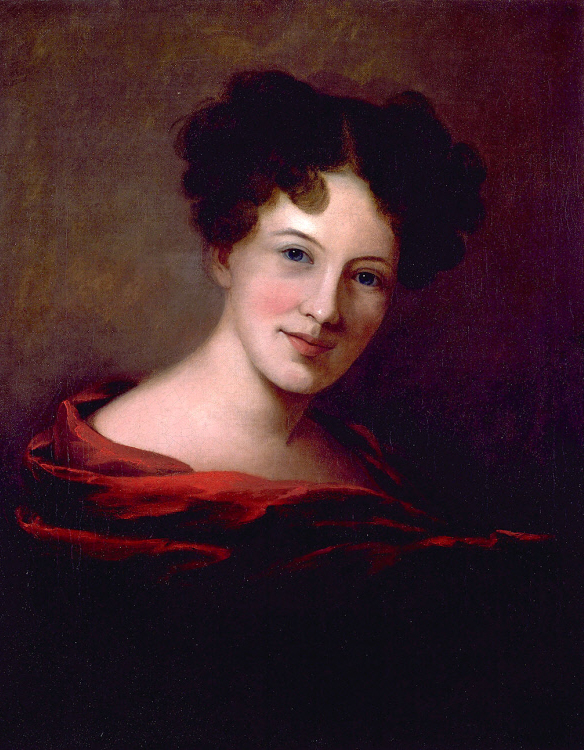
Sarah Miriam Peale (1800–1885)

- Francis Alexander (d. 1881), painter
- Sarah Miriam Peale (d. 1885), portrait painter

=== 1801 ===
- John Quidor (d. 1881), painter
- Thomas Cole (d. 1848), painter
- Henry Inman (d. 1846), painter

=== 1803 ===
- Robert Walter Weir (d. 1889), painter

=== 1804 ===
- Fitz Henry Lane (d. 1865), painter

=== 1805 ===
- Hiram Powers (d. 1873), sculptor

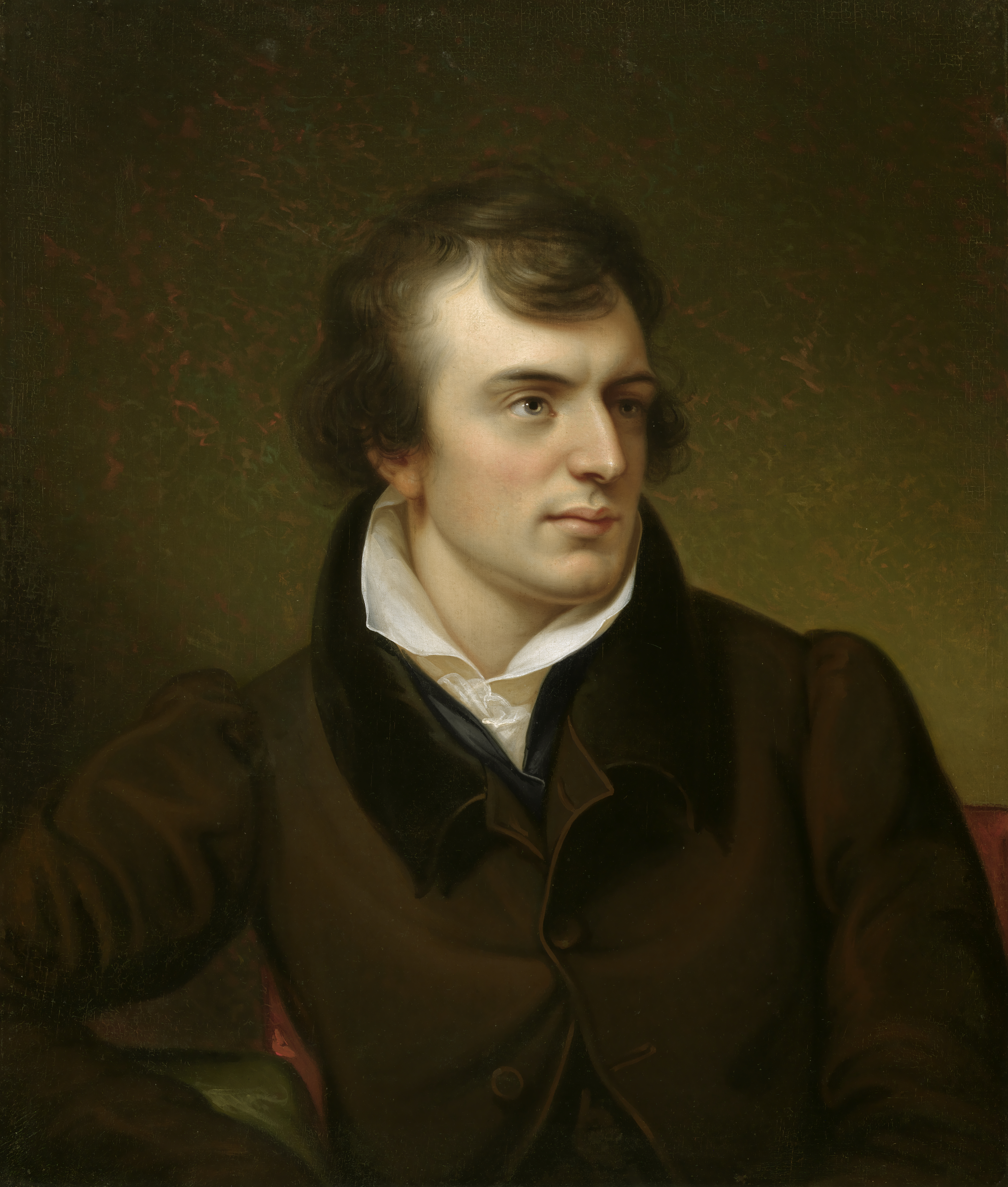
Horatio Greenough (1805–1852)

- Horatio Greenough (d. 1852), sculptor

=== 1806 ===
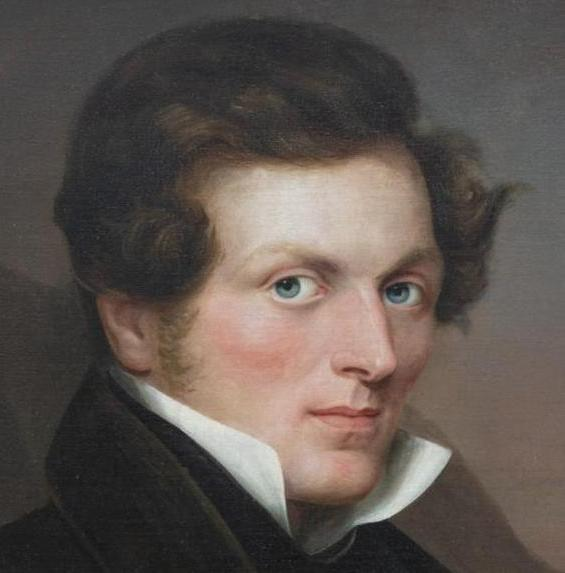
Peter Rindisbacher (1806–1834)

- Peter Rindisbacher (d. 1834), Swiss-born watercolorist, illustrator

=== 1807 ===
- William Sidney Mount (d. 1868), painter

=== 1808 ===
- Seth Eastman (d. 1875), painter, illustrator

=== 1809 ===
- James Guy Evans (1809/1810–1859), painter
- Moses Billings (d. 1884), portrait painter
- George Winter (d. 1876), English-born portrait painter noted for his pictures of Potawatomi and Miami figures

== Born 1810–1819 ==
=== 1811 ===
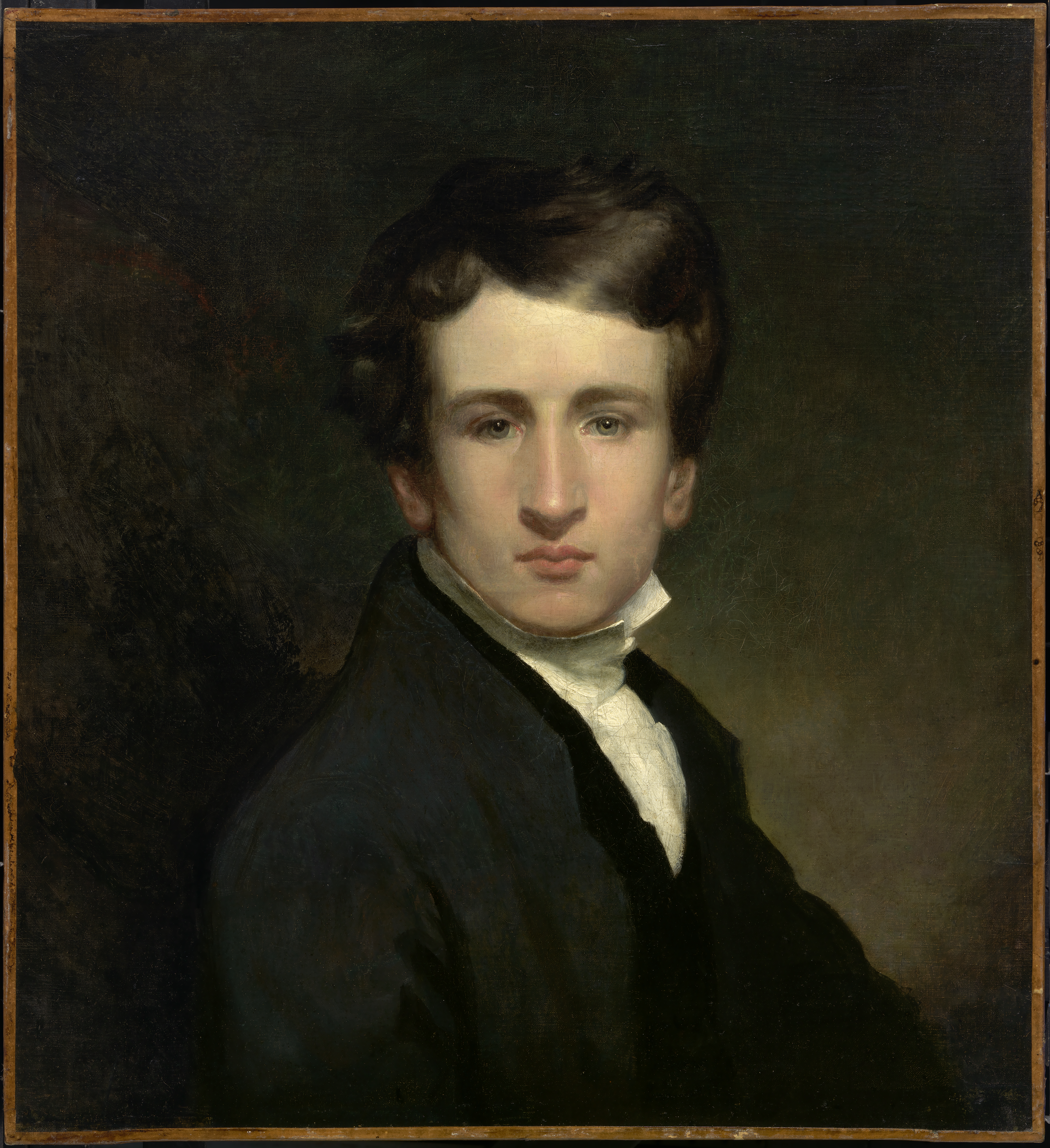
William Page (1811–1885)

- William Page (d. 1885), painter
- George Caleb Bingham (d. 1879), painter
- John William Casilear (d. 1893), painter

=== 1812 ===
- Jane Stuart (d. 1888), portrait painter
- Peter F. Rothermel (d. 1895), painter

=== 1813 ===
- Asahel Lynde Powers (d. 1843), portrait painter
- Nathaniel Currier (d. 1888), lithographer
- William Ranney (d. 1857), painter
- George Peter Alexander Healy (d. 1894), portrait painter
- Joseph Goodhue Chandler (d. 1884), portrait painter

=== 1814 ===
- Edward Bailey (d. 1903), painter

=== 1815 ===
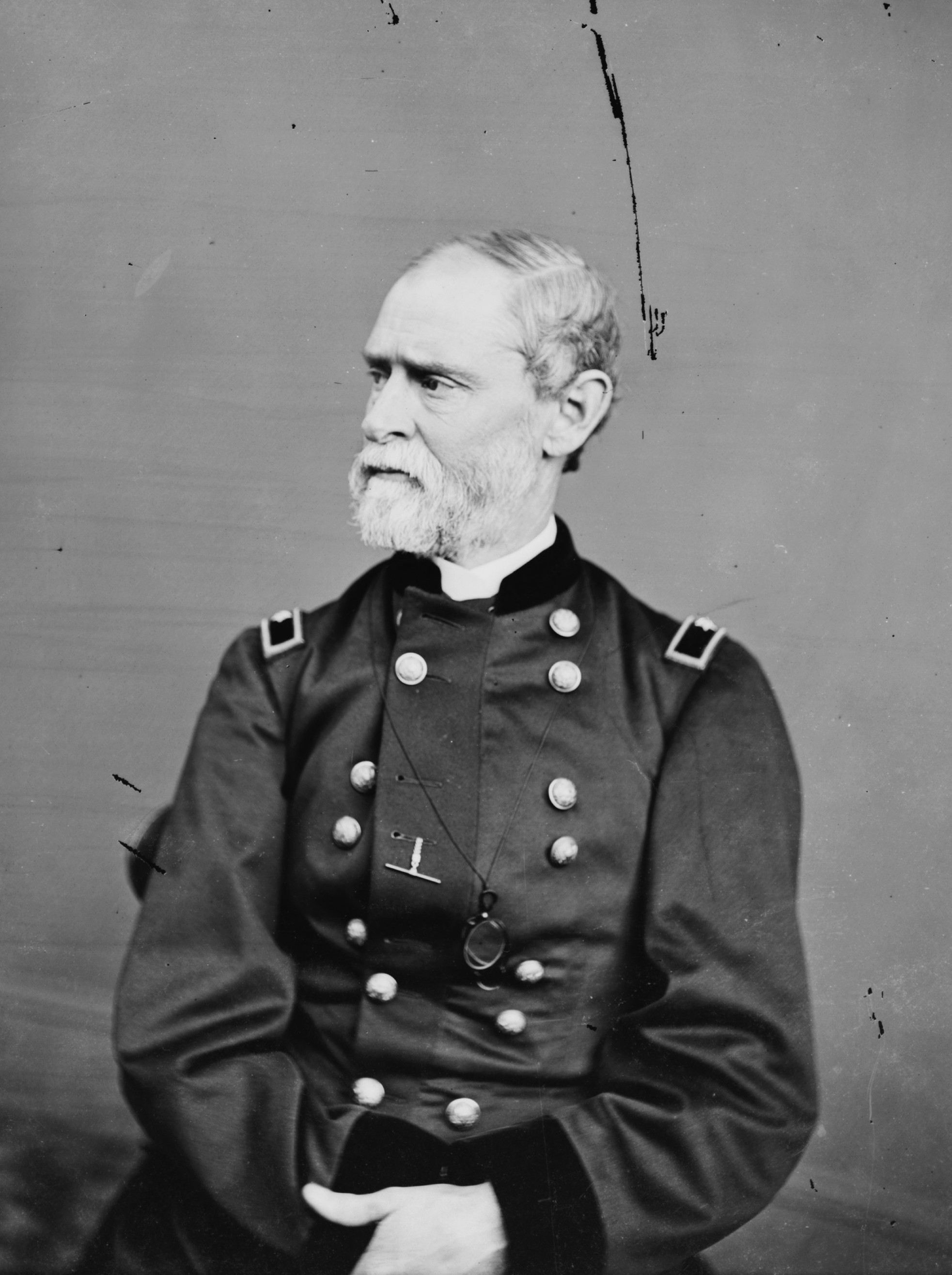
Joseph Horace Eaton (1815–1896)

- Joseph Horace Eaton (d. 1896), New Mexico landscapes

=== 1816 ===
- Daniel DeWitt Tompkins Davie (d. 1877), photographer
- John Frederick Kensett (d. 1872), painter
- Emanuel Gottlieb Leutze (d. 1868), painter
- George Whiting Flagg (d. 1898), painter

=== 1817 ===
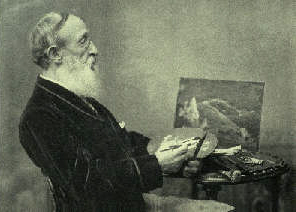
Benjamin Champney (1817–1907)

- Benjamin Champney (d. 1907), painter

=== 1819 ===
- James Augustus Suydam (d. 1865), painter
- Richard Saltonstall Greenough (d. 1904), sculptor
- Martin Johnson Heade (d. 1904), painter

== Born 1820–1829 ==
=== 1820 ===
- Aramenta Dianthe Vail (d. 1888), painter
- John E. Weyss (d. 1903), artist, cartographer
- Worthington Whittredge (d. 1910), painter

=== 1821 ===
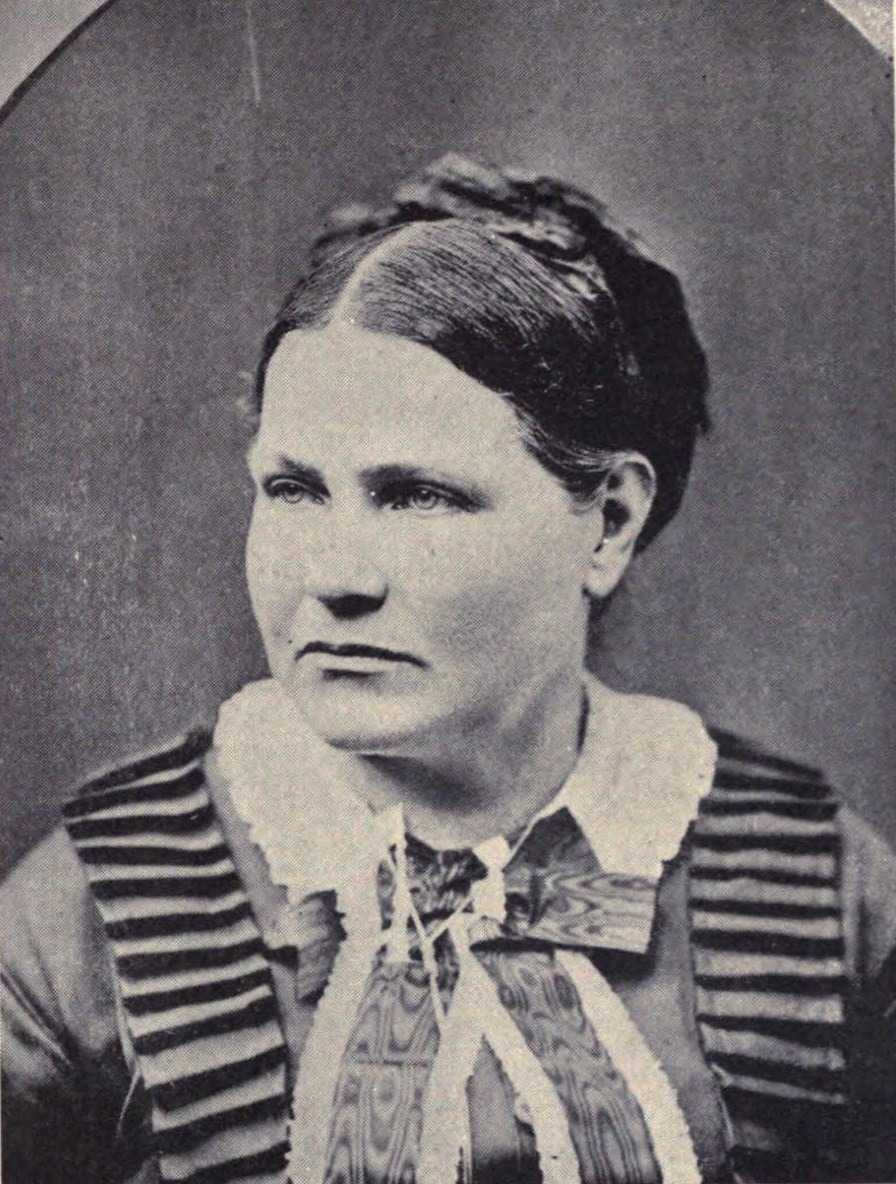
Persis Goodale Thurston Taylor (1821–1906)

- Robert S. Duncanson (d. 1872), painter, muralist
- Persis Goodale Thurston Taylor (d. 1906), Hawaiian-born painter, sketch artist

=== 1822 ===
- Mathew Brady (d. 1896), photographer

=== 1823 ===
- Jasper Francis Cropsey (d. 1900), painter
- William Hart (d. 1894), painter
- Sanford Robinson Gifford (d. 1880), painter
- Daniel Folger Bigelow (d. 1910), painter
- Thomas Waterman Wood (d. 1903), painter

=== 1824 ===
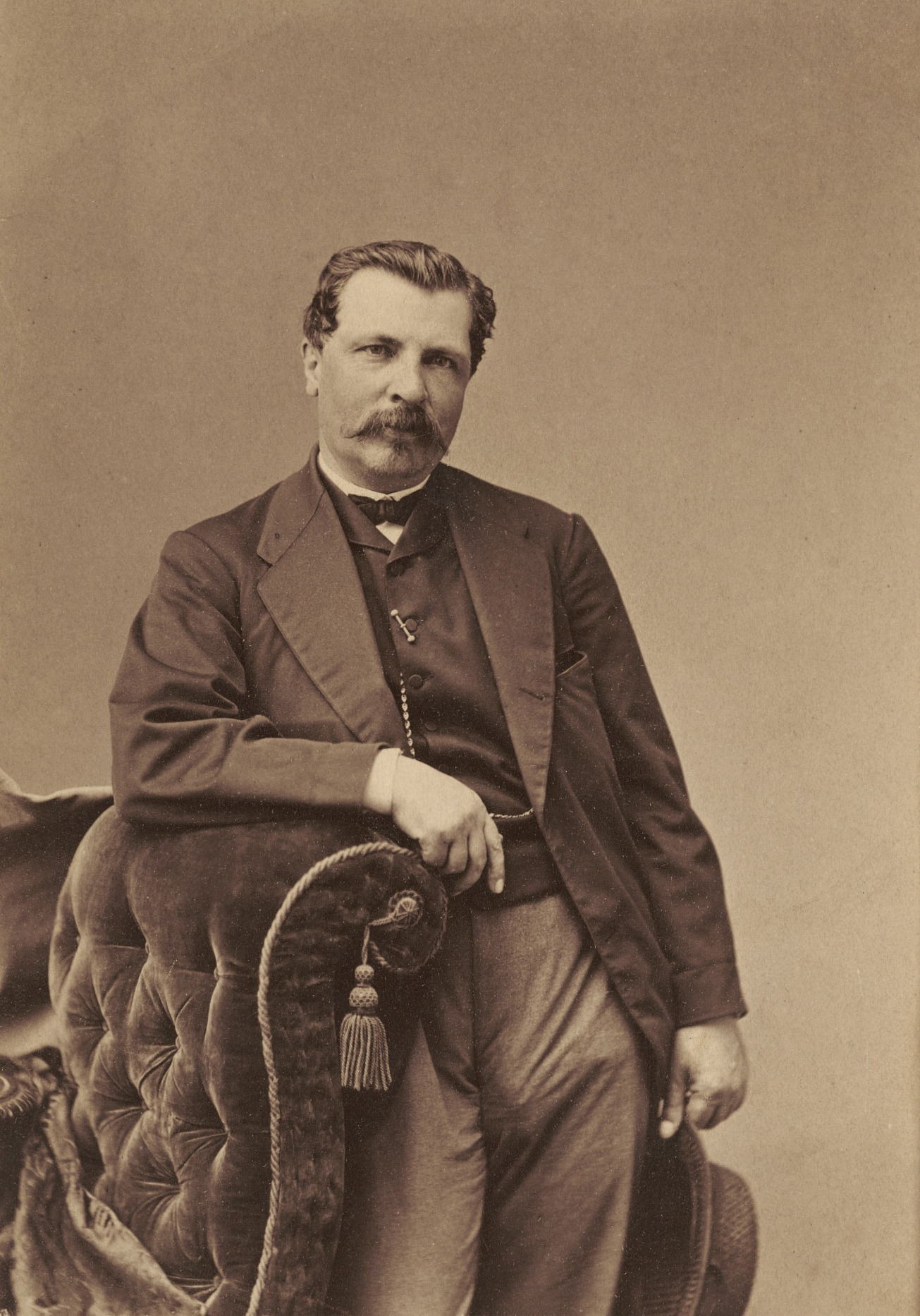
James Merritt Ives (1824–1895)

- James Merritt Ives (d. 1895), lithographer
- William Morris Hunt (d. 1879), painter
- Eastman Johnson (d. 1906), painter
- Vincent Colyer (d. 1888), painter
- Elizabeth Gilbert Jerome (d. 1910), painter

=== 1825 ===
- George Inness (d. 1894), painter
- Benjamin Paul Akers (d. 1861), sculptor
- William Henry Rinehart (d. 1874), sculptor
- Jacob Guptil Fletcher (d. 1889), painter

=== 1826 ===
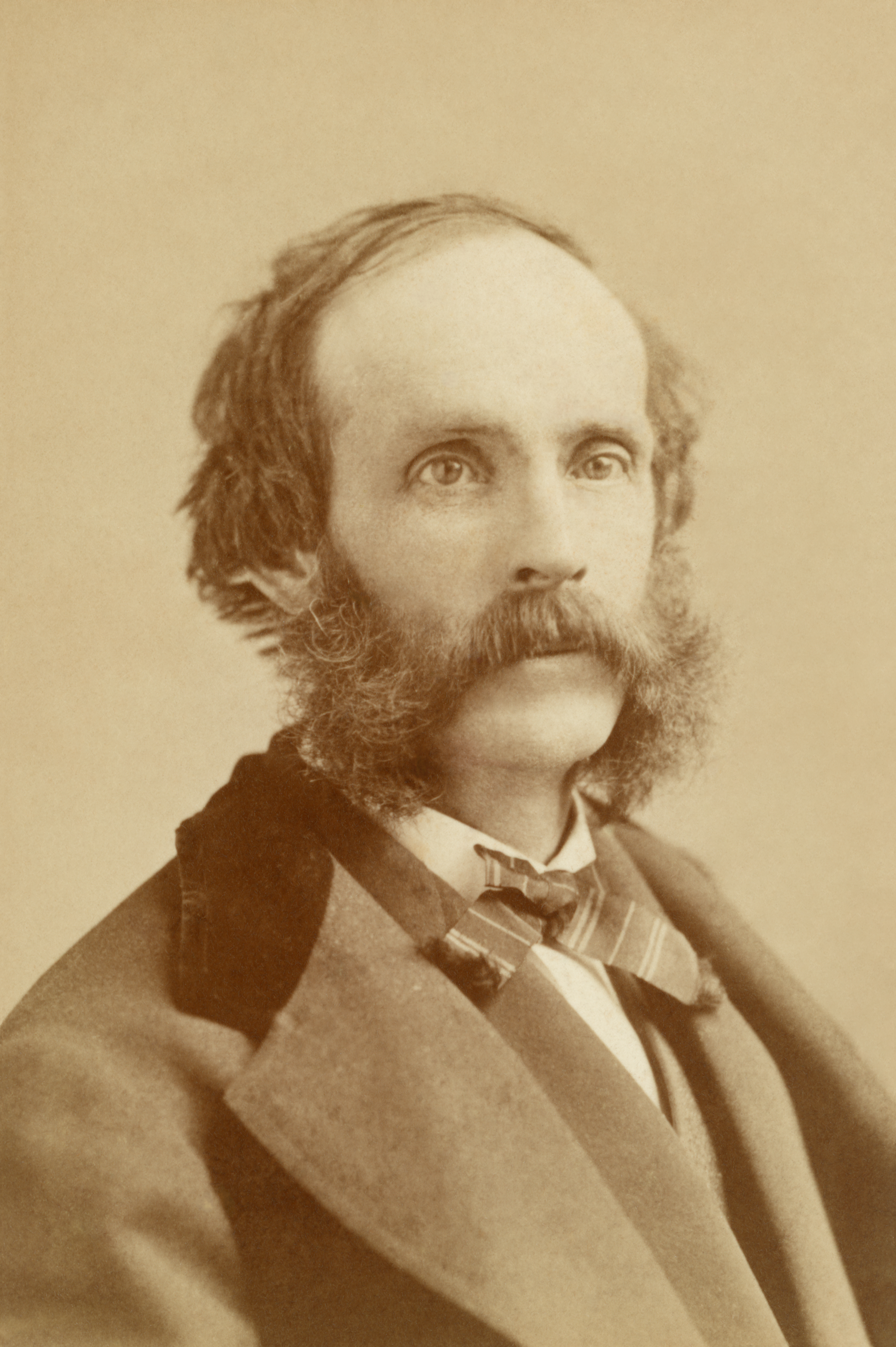
Frederic Edwin Church (1826–1900)

- Caroline L. Ormes Ransom (d. 1910), painter
- Frederic Edwin Church (d. 1900), painter

=== 1827 ===
- Candace Wheeler (d. 1923), interior design, textile design
- David Johnson (d. 1908), painter
- Francis Blackwell Mayer (d. 1899), painter

=== 1828 ===
- James McDougal Hart (d. 1901), painter
- Jervis McEntee (d. 1891), painter
- Edward Mitchell Bannister (d. 1901), painter

=== 1829 ===
- Edward Moran (d. 1901), painter

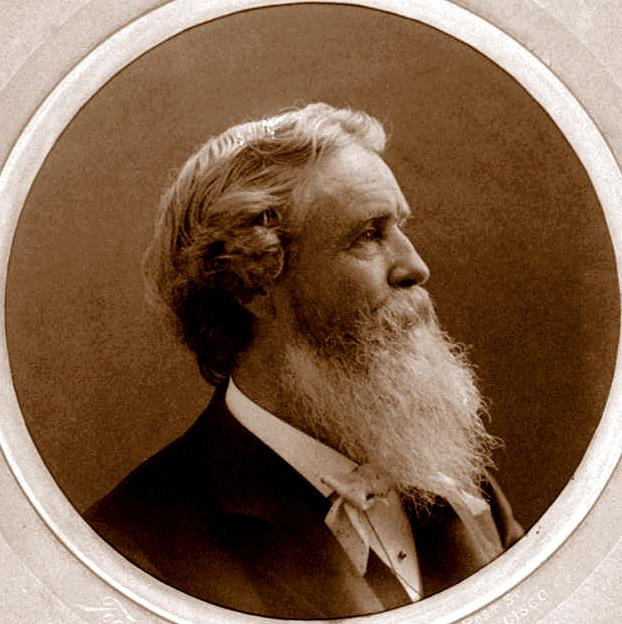
Thomas Hill (1829–1908)

- Thomas Hill (d. 1908)
- Albert Fitch Bellows (d. 1883), painter

== Born 1830–1839 ==
=== 1830 ===
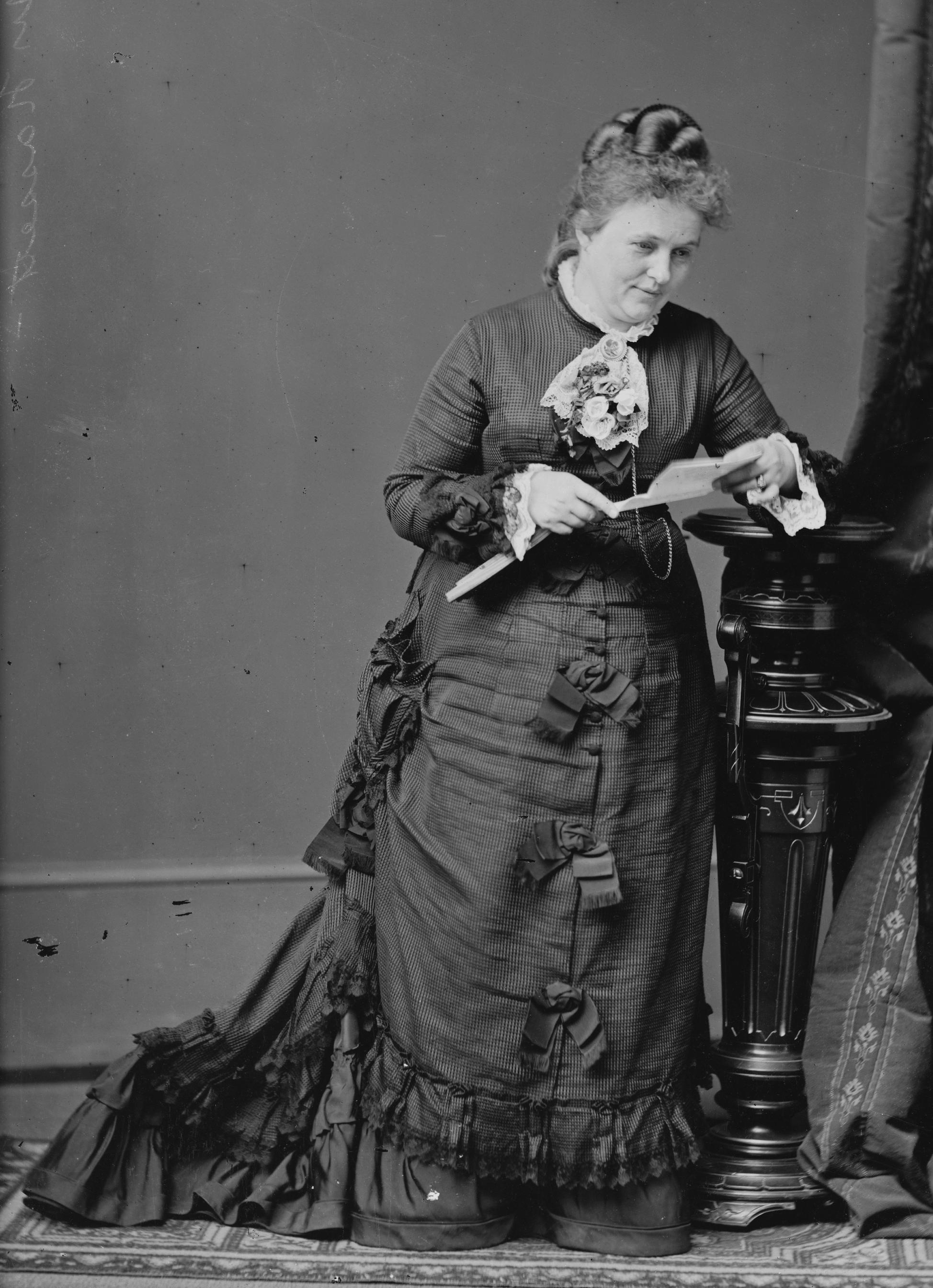
Cornelia Adele Strong Fassett (1831–1898)

- Sylvester Phelps Hodgdon (d. 1906), painter
- Granville Perkins (d. 1895), painter, engraver
- Albert Bierstadt (d. 1902), painter
- Eadweard Muybridge (d. 1904), photographer
- John Quincy Adams Ward (d. 1910), sculptor

=== 1831 ===
- Cornelia Adele Strong Fassett (d. 1898), political portrait painter

=== 1832 ===
- Samuel Colman (d. 1920), painter, interior designer
- Daniel Charles Grose (d. 1900), painter
- William Savage (d. 1908), painter
- Hermann Ottomar Herzog (d. 1932), German-born painter

=== 1833 ===
- Hugo Wilhelm Arthur Nahl (d. 1889), painter, daguerreotyper, engraver, portraitist
- Margaret Girvin Gillin (d. 1915), painter
- William Trost Richards (d. 1905), painter

=== 1834 ===
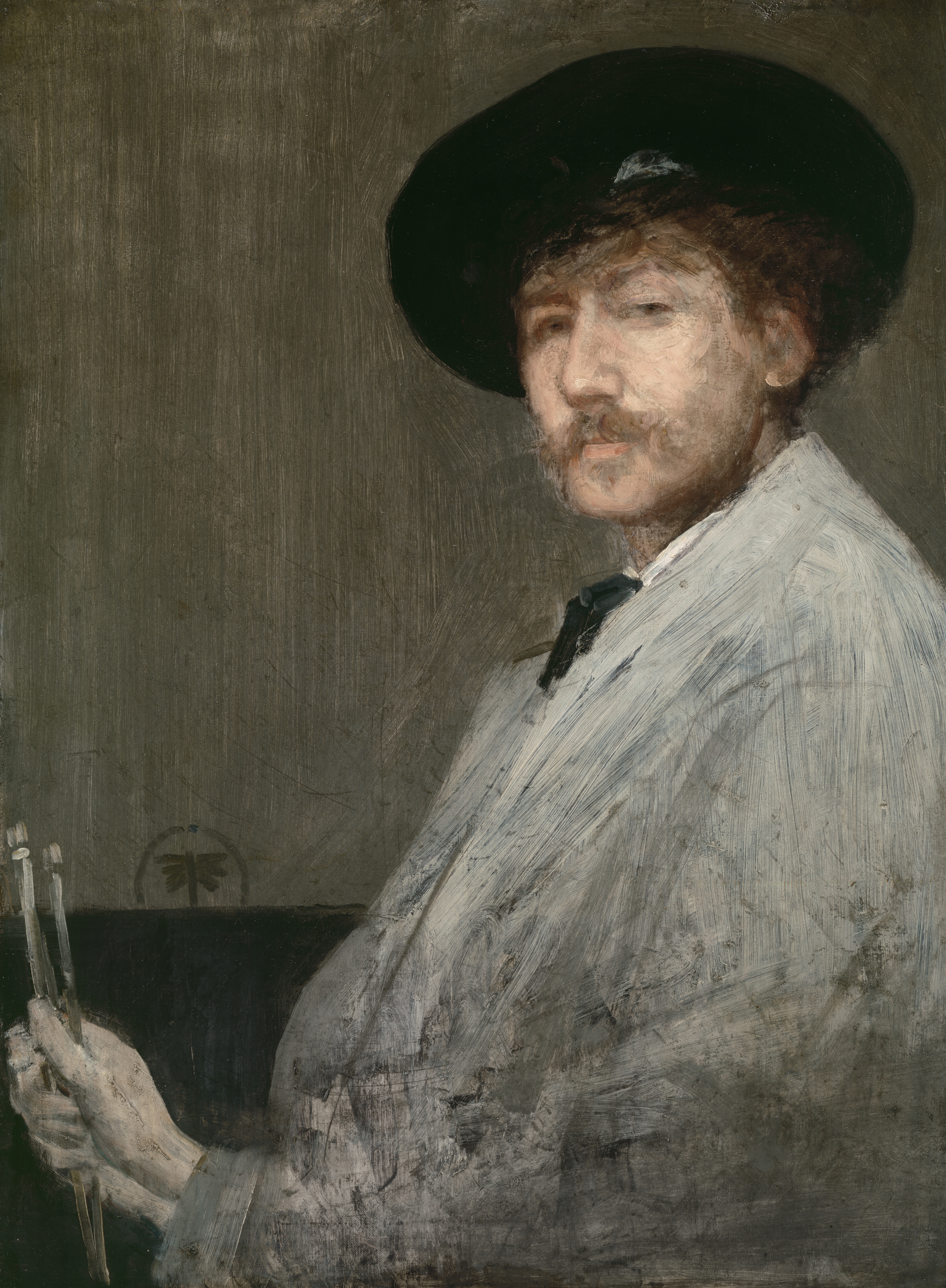
James McNeill Whistler (1834–1903)

- Caspar Buberl (d. 1899), sculptor
- James McNeill Whistler (d. 1903), painter, printmaker
- Dwight Benton (d. 1903), painter

=== 1835 ===
- John LaFarge (d. 1910), painter, stained-glass window designer
- William Stanley Haseltine (d. 1900), painter
- Adah Isaacs Menken (d. 1868), painter, poet, actress
- Edmund Darch Lewis (d. 1910), painter

=== 1836 ===
- Alexander Helwig Wyant (d. 1892), painter
- Winslow Homer (d. 1910), painter, illustrator, printmaker

=== 1837 ===
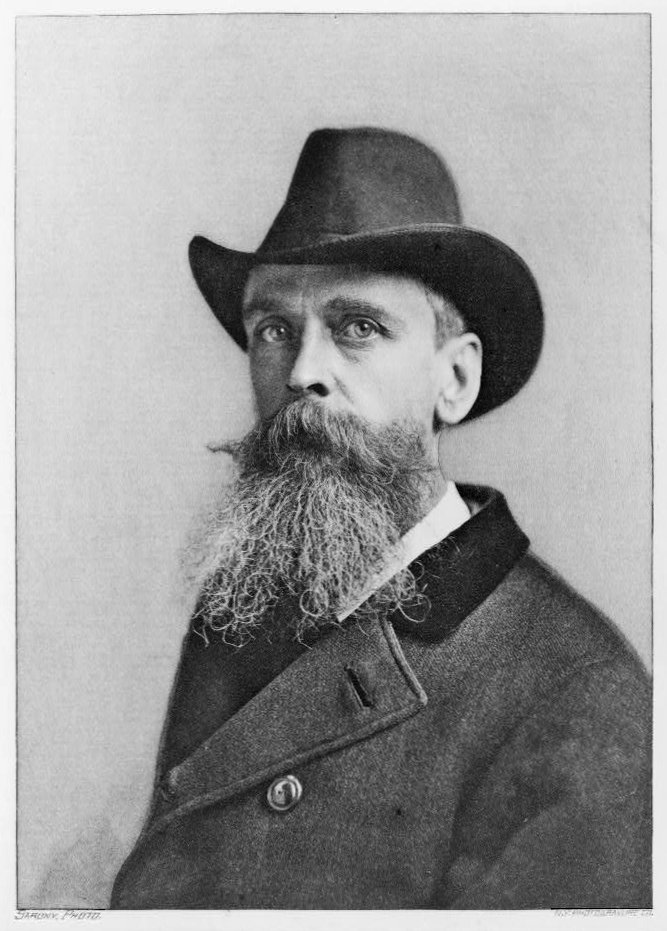
Thomas Moran (1837–1926)

- Thomas Moran (d. 1926), painter
- Alfred Thompson Bricher (d. 1908), painter
- Robert Wilson Andrews (d. 1922)
- Elizabeth Jane Gardner (d. 1922), salon painter

=== 1838 ===
- Caroline Morgan Clowes (d. 1904), painter

=== 1839 ===
- Robert Wylie (d. 1877), painter
- Robert Crannell Minor (d. 1904), painter
- Arthur Quartley (d. 1886), painter
- Henry Bacon (d. 1912), painter

== Born 1840–1849 ==
=== 1840 ===
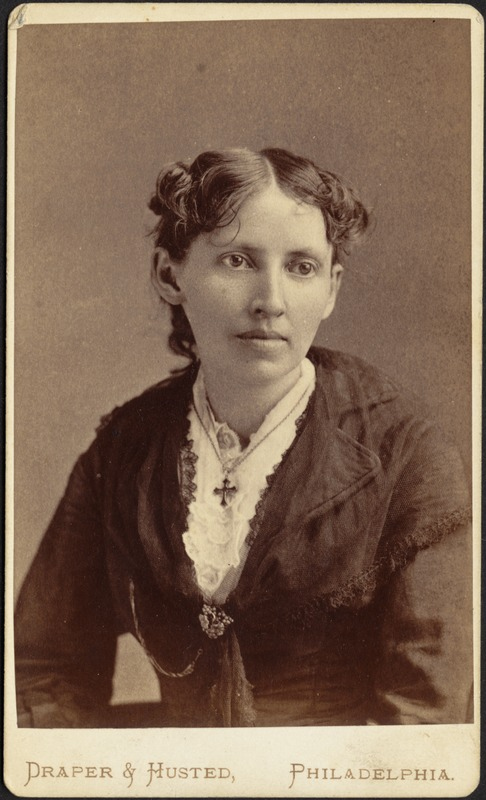
Caroline Shawk Brooks (1840–1913)

- Caroline Shawk Brooks (d. 1913), sculptor
- Abigail May Alcott Nieriker (d. 1879), artist
- Thomas Nast (d. 1902), caricaturist, cartoonist, illustrator
- Robert Swain Gifford (d. 1905), painter
- Thomas Hovenden (d. 1895), painter

=== 1841 ===
- Edward Lamson Henry (d. 1919), painter
- Theodore Otto Langerfeldt (d. 1906), painter
- John Ferguson Weir (d. 1926), painter, sculptor
- John Joseph Enneking (d. 1916), painter

=== 1842 ===
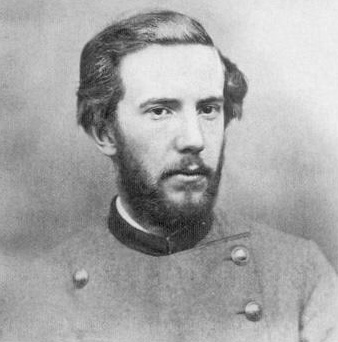
Conrad Wise Chapman (1842–1910)

- Willis Seaver Adams (d. 1921), painter
- Elizabeth Howard Bartol (d. 1927), painter
- Conrad Wise Chapman (d. 1910), war painter

=== 1843 ===
- Preston Powers (d. 1904), sculptor
- Alexander Wilson Drake (d. 1916), painter, wood engraver
- William Henry Jackson (d. 1942), painter, photographer
- George Albert Frost (d. 1907), painter

=== 1844 ===
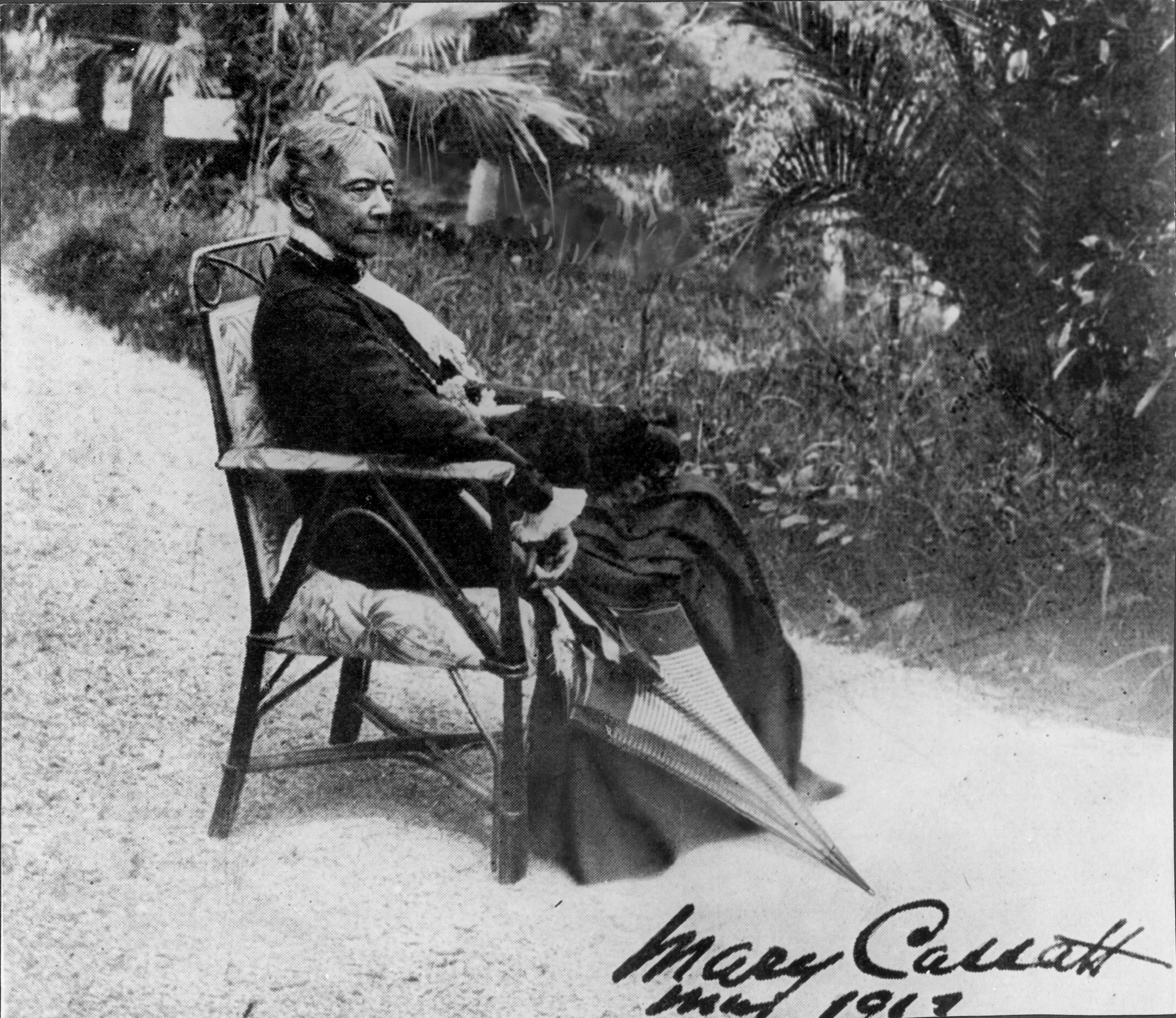
Mary Cassatt (1844–1926)

- Carl Gutherz (d. 1907), symbolist
- Henry Farrer (d. 1903), painter, printmaker
- Olin Levi Warner (d. 1896), sculptor
- Mary Cassatt (d. 1926), painter, printmaker
- Edmonia Lewis (d. 1911), sculptor
- Thomas Eakins (d. 1916), painter, photographer, sculptor
- Moses Jacob Ezekiel (d. 1917), sculptor

=== 1846 ===
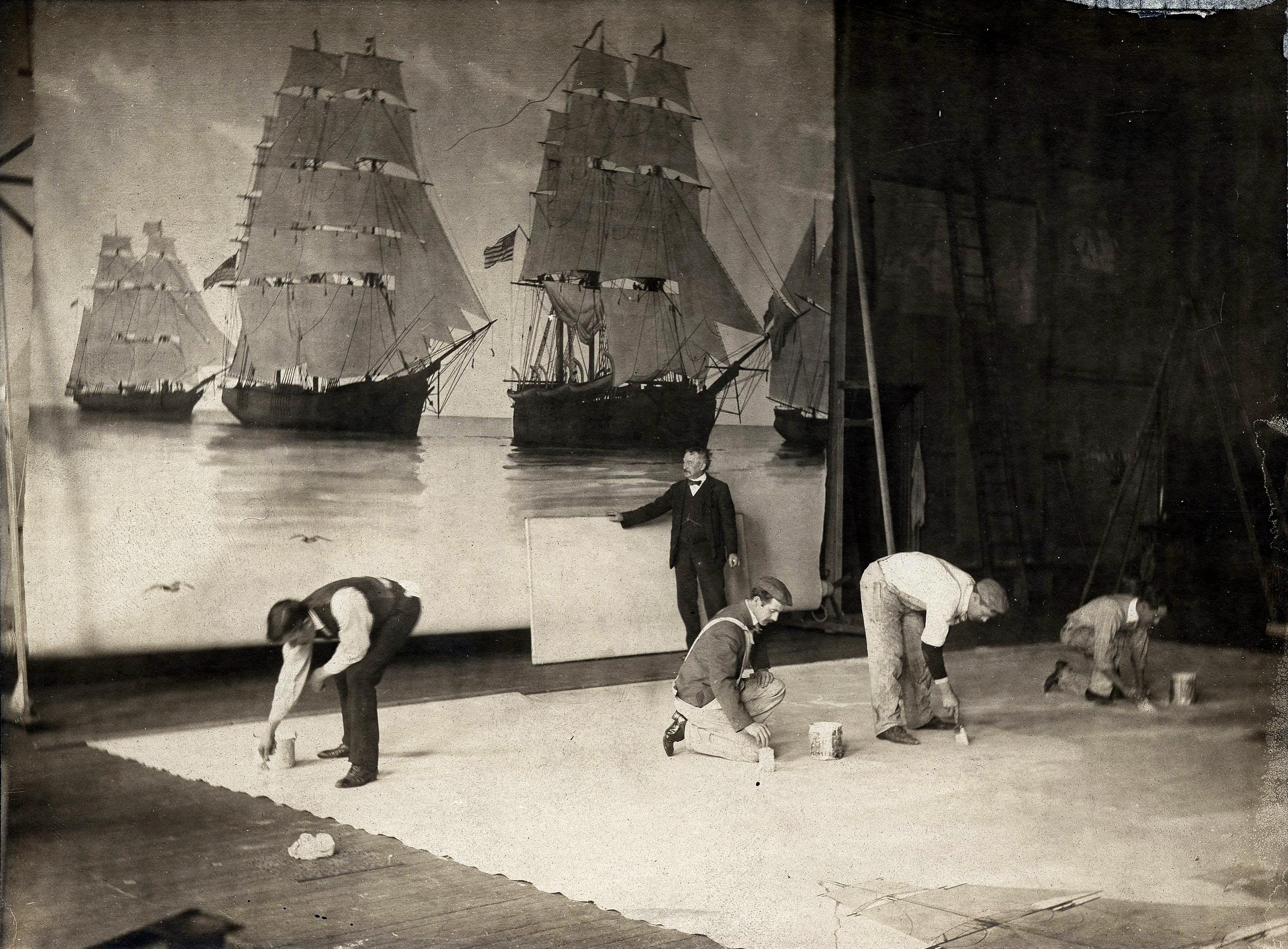
Francis Davis Millet (center, standing; 1848–1912)

- Julian Scott (d. 1901), painter, Civil War artist
- Alexander Milne Calder (d. 1923), sculptor

=== 1847 ===
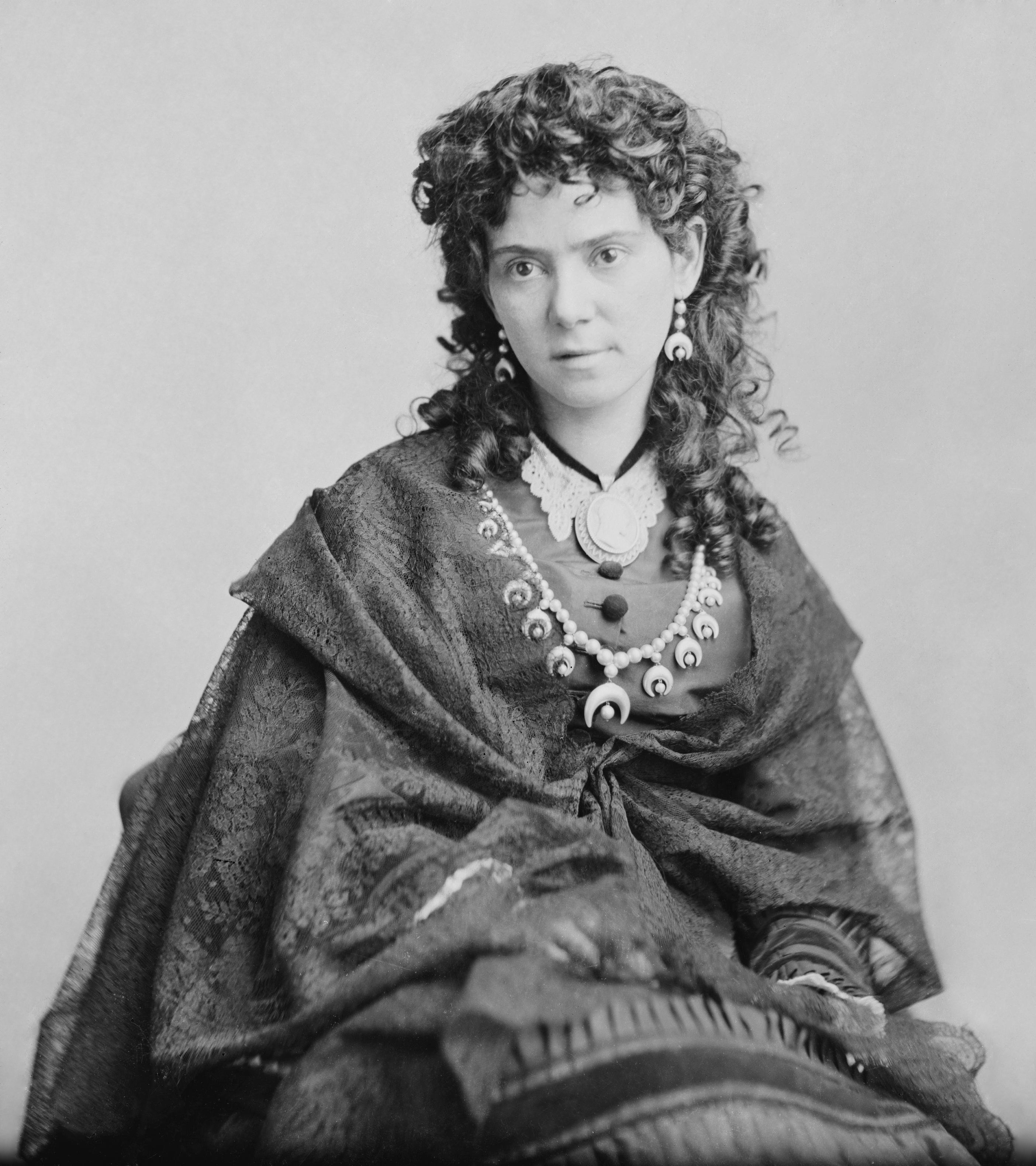
Vinnie Ream (1847–1914)

- Irene E. Parmelee (d. 1934), portrait artist
- Albert Pinkham Ryder (d. 1917), painter
- Vinnie Ream (d. 1914), sculptor
- Ralph Albert Blakelock (d. 1919), painter
- Frederick Arthur Bridgman (d. 1928), painter
- Frederick Dielman (d. 1935), painter
- T. C. Steele (d. 1926), painter

=== 1848 ===
- Lilla Cabot Perry (d. 1933), painter
- Louis Comfort Tiffany (d. 1933), artist, designer
- Augustus Saint-Gaudens (d. 1907), sculptor
- Charles Henry Francis Turner (d. 1908), painter
- William Harnett (d. 1892), painter
- Frank Duveneck (d. 1919), painter
- Francis Davis Millet (d. 1912), painter

=== 1849 ===
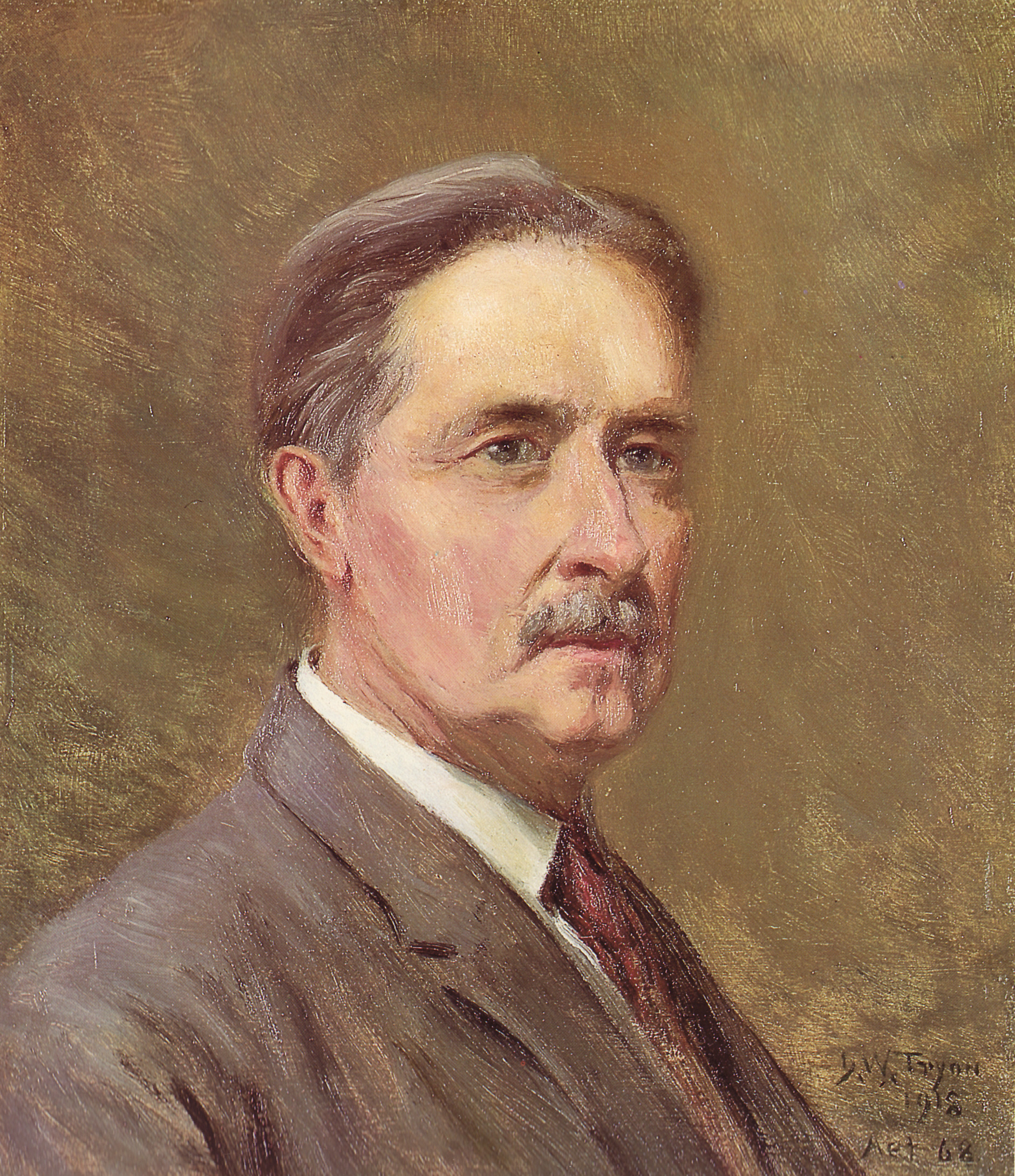
Dwight William Tryon (1849–1925)

- George Newell Bowers (d. 1909), painter
- Frank C. Penfold (d. 1921), painter
- Jacob Riis (d. 1914), photographer
- Abbott Handerson Thayer (d. 1921), painter
- Dwight William Tryon (d. 1925), painter
- Rufus Fairchild Zogbaum (d. 1925), illustrator, painter
- William Merritt Chase (d. 1916), painter

== Born 1850–1859 ==
=== 1850 ===
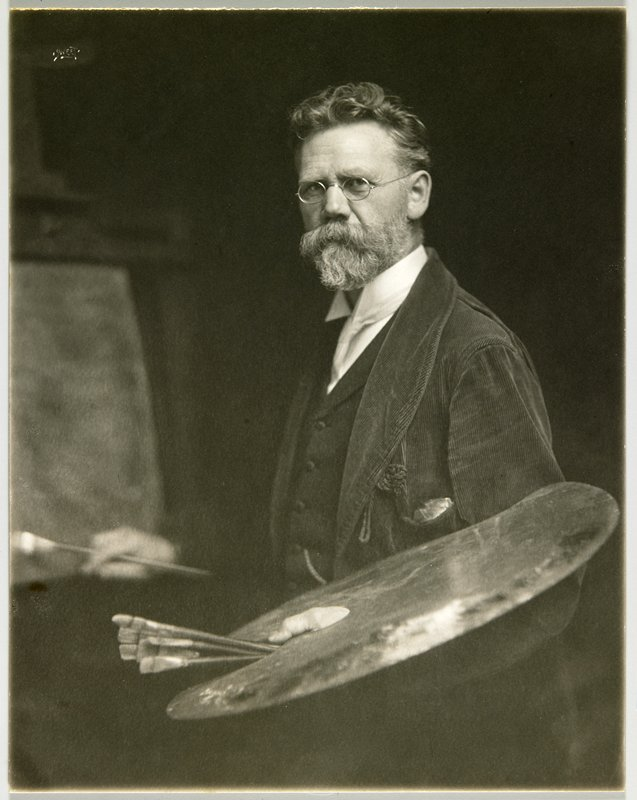
Robert Koehler (1850–1914)

- Alfred Lambourne (d. 1926), English-born painter
- Daniel Chester French (d. 1931), sculptor
- George Hitchcock (d. 1913), painter
- Paul E. Harney (d. 1915), artist
- Antonio Jacobsen (d. 1921), Danish-born painter
- Robert Koehler (d. 1917), German-born painter

=== 1851 ===
- Arthur Burdett Frost (d. 1928), illustrator, graphic artist, comics writer, painter
- Thomas Dewing (d. 1938), painter
- J. Ottis Adams (d. 1927), painter
- Thomas Pollock Anshutz (d. 1912), painter

=== 1852 ===
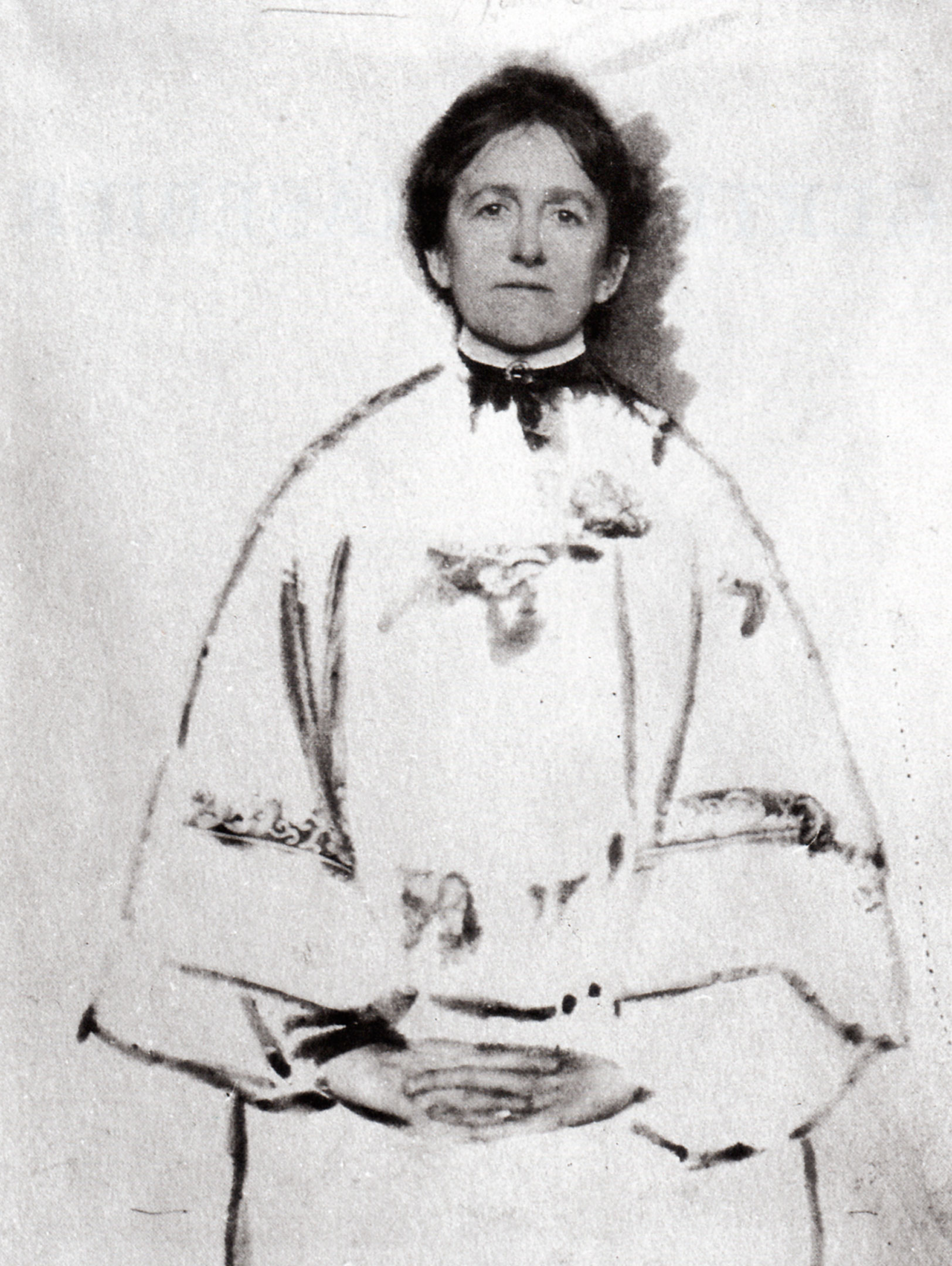
Gertrude Käsebier (1852–1934)

- Charles Graham (d. 1911), illustrator, painter
- Alfred Richard Gurrey Sr. (d. 1944), English-born landscape painter
- Edwin Austin Abbey (d. 1911), illustrator, painter
- Gertrude Käsebier (d. 1934), photographer
- Theodore Robinson (d. 1896), painter
- J. Alden Weir (d. 1919), painter
- James Carroll Beckwith (d. 1917), painter

=== 1853 ===
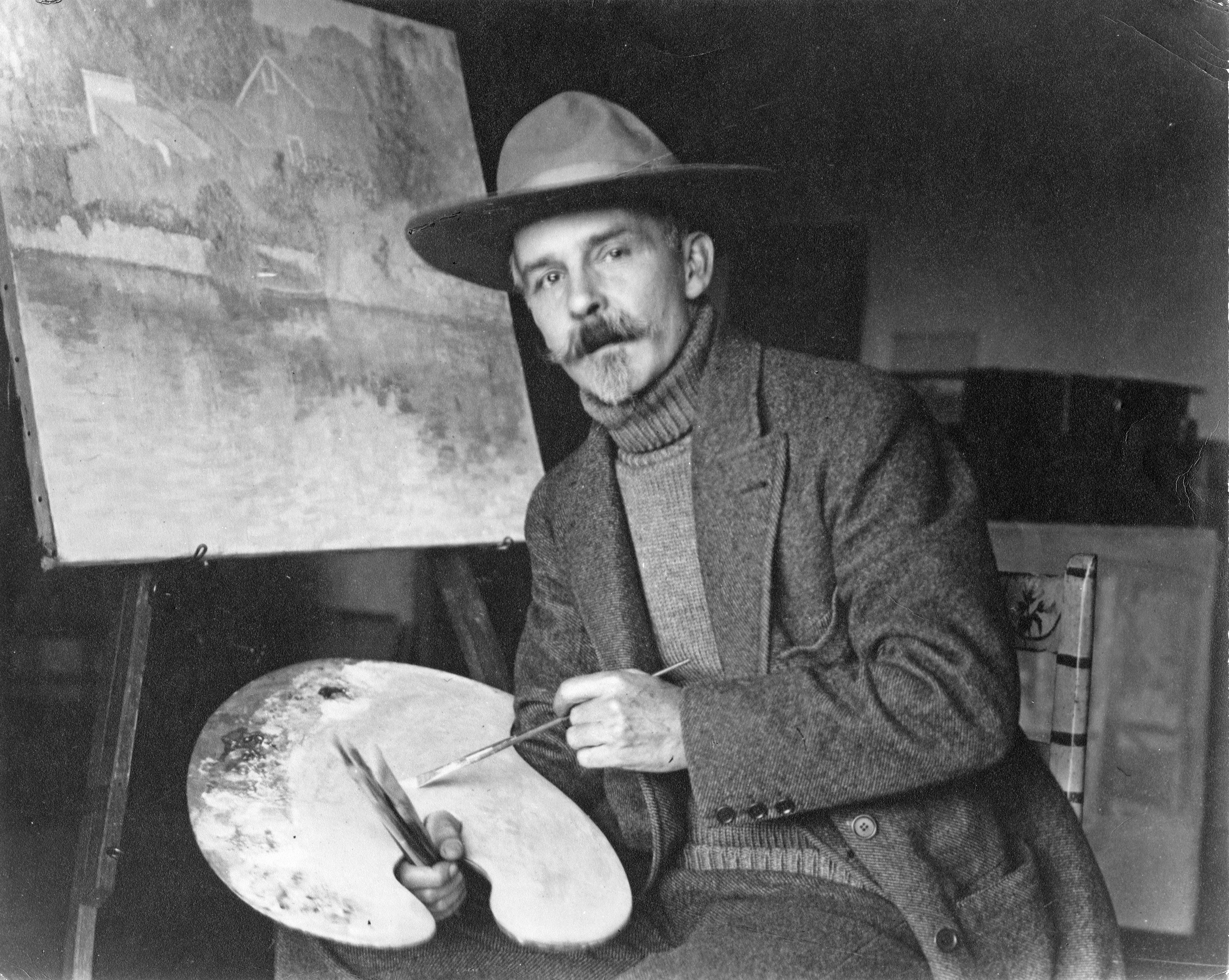
Henry Fitch Taylor (1853–1925)

- T. Alexander Harrison (d. 1930), painter
- Howard Pyle (d. 1911), illustrator
- William Turner Dannat (d. 1929), painter
- Henry Fitch Taylor (d. 1925), painter
- John Henry Twachtman (d. 1902), painter
- John Francis Murphy (d. 1921), painter

=== 1854 ===
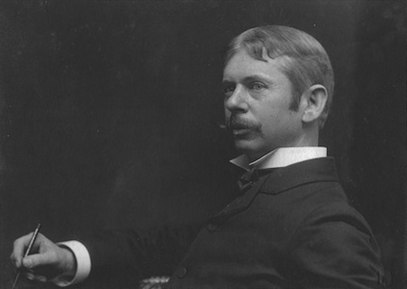
William Forsyth (1854–1935)

- William Henry Chandler (d. 1928), painter in pastels
- Hugo Anton Fisher (d. 1916), Bohemian-born painter
- William Forsyth (d. 1935), painter
- George Inness, Jr. (d. 1926), painter
- John Frederick Peto (d. 1907), painter
- Herbjørn Gausta (d. 1924), Norwegian-born landscape artist
- Leonard Ochtman (d. 1935), painter
- L. Birge Harrison (d. 1929), painter

=== 1855 ===
- Charles Henry Niehaus (d. 1935), sculptor
- Jacob Fjelde (d. 1896), Norwegian-born sculptor
- Cecilia Beaux (d. 1942), painter
- James Edward Kelly (d. 1933), sculptor, illustrator
- Julius LeBlanc Stewart (d. 1919), painter
- Claudine Raguet Hirst (d. 1942), still life painter

=== 1856 ===
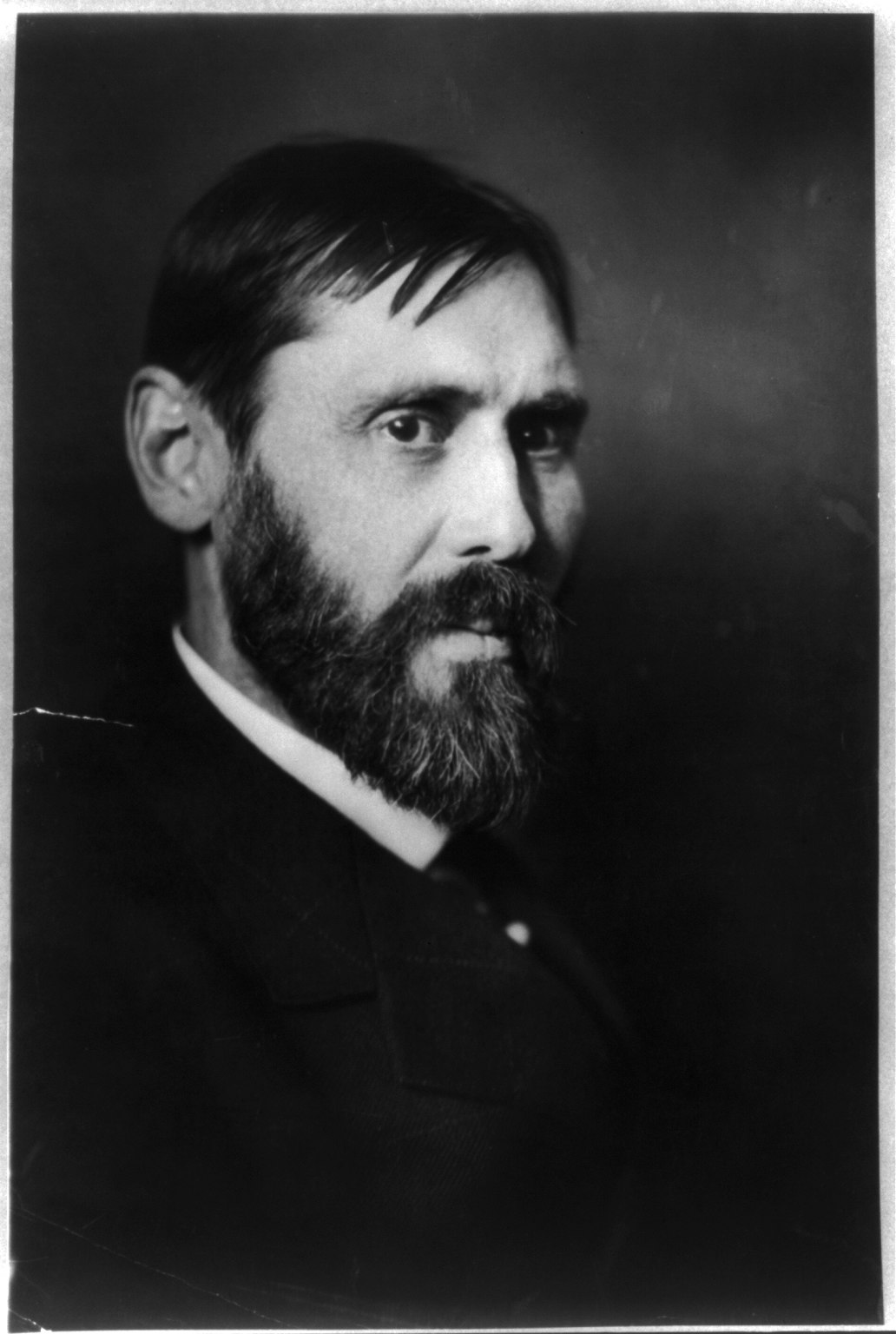
Kenyon Cox (1856–1919)

- Robert C. Barnfield (d. 1893), English-born painter
- John Haberle (d. 1933), painter
- Charles Harold Davis (d. 1933), painter
- John Singer Sargent (d. 1925), portrait artist
- Colin Campbell Cooper (d. 1937), painter
- Kenyon Cox (d. 1919), painter
- Anna Elizabeth Klumpke (d. 1942), painter

=== 1857 ===
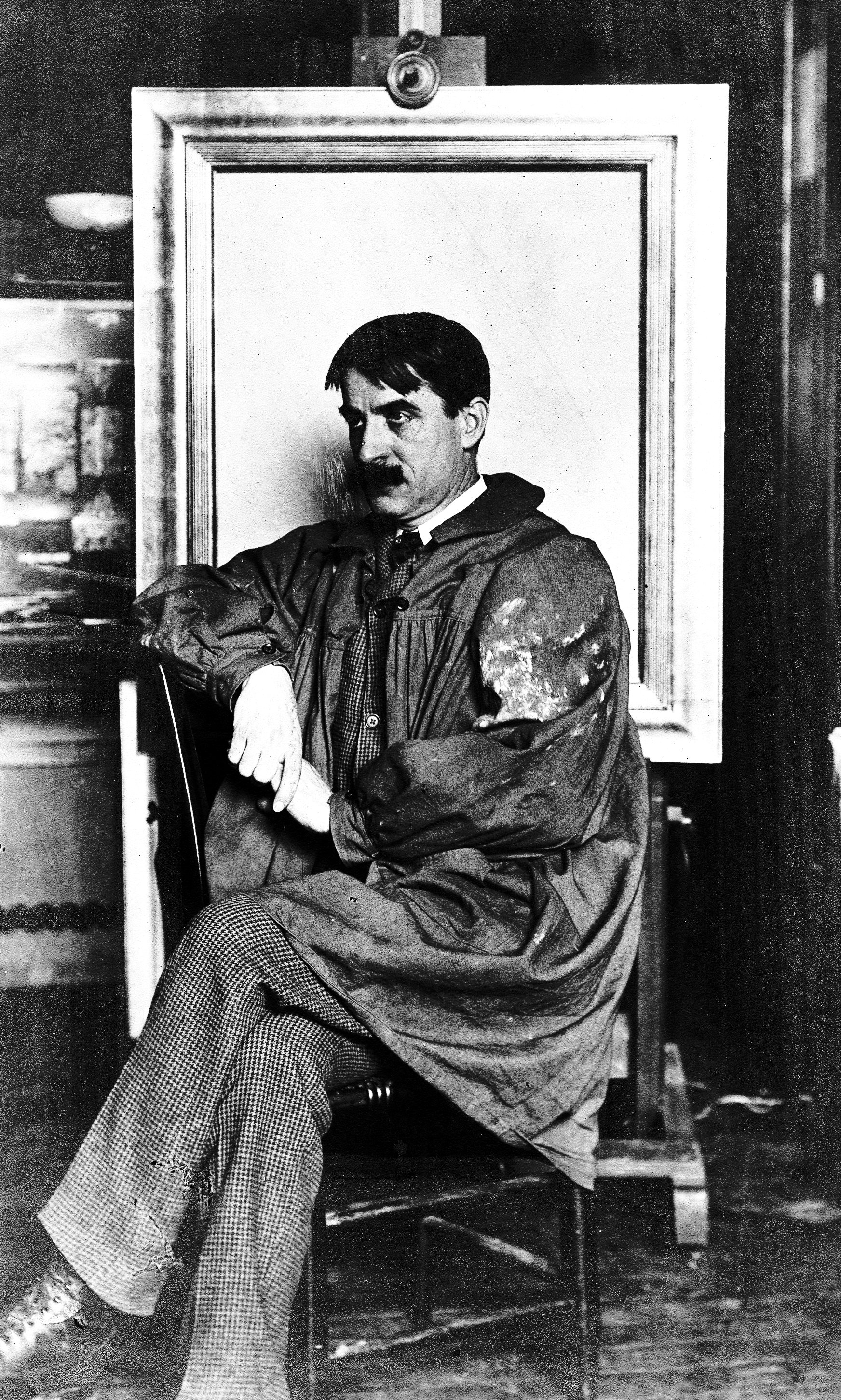
Bruce Crane (1857–1937)

- Emma B. King (d. 1933), Impressionist
- Florence MacKubin (d. 1918), portrait painter
- Frank Raubicheck (d. 1952), painter
- Alice Pike Barney (d. 1931), painter
- Charles Warren Eaton (d. 1937), painter
- Arthur Wesley Dow (d. 1922), painter, printmaker
- George E. Ohr (d. 1918), ceramic potter
- Lucy Angeline Bacon (d. 1932), painter
- Mary Rogers Williams (d. 1907), painter
- Edward Wilson Currier (d. 1918), painter
- Bruce Crane (d. 1937), painter
- John Vanderpoel (d. 1911), painter, graphics
- Edward Clark Potter (d. 1923), sculptor

=== 1858 ===
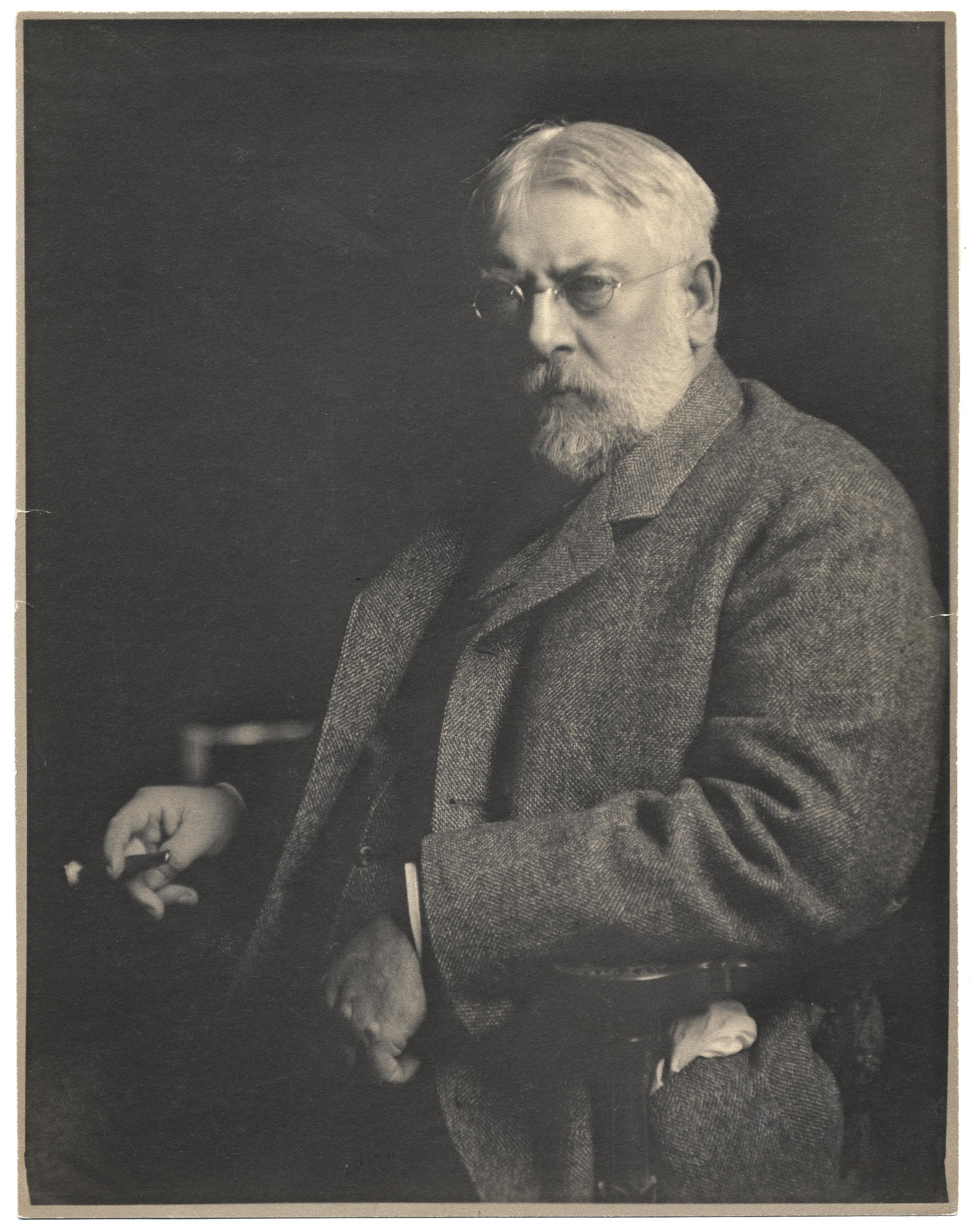
Henry Ward Ranger (1858–1916)

- Herbert Adams (d. 1945), sculptor
- Henry Ward Ranger (d. 1916), painter
- Willard Metcalf (d. 1925), painter
- Francis Edwin Elwell (d. 1922), sculptor
- Henry Siddons Mowbray (d. 1928), painter
- Frederick Gottwald (d. 1941), painter
- William B. T. Trego (d. 1909), painter
- Maurice Prendergast (d. 1924), painter
- Joseph DeCamp (d. 1923), painter
- Edward Otho Cresap Ord, II (d. 1923), painter, poet
- Charles S. Kaelin (d. 1929, painter

=== 1859 ===
- Walter Leighton Clark (d. 1935), painter, sculptor
- George Elbert Burr (d. 1939), painter, printmaker
- Henry Ossawa Tanner (d. 1937), painter
- Joseph Henry Sharp (d. 1953), painter
- Childe Hassam (d. 1935), painter, printmaker
- William Bliss Baker (d. 1886), painter

== Born 1860–1869 ==
=== 1860 ===
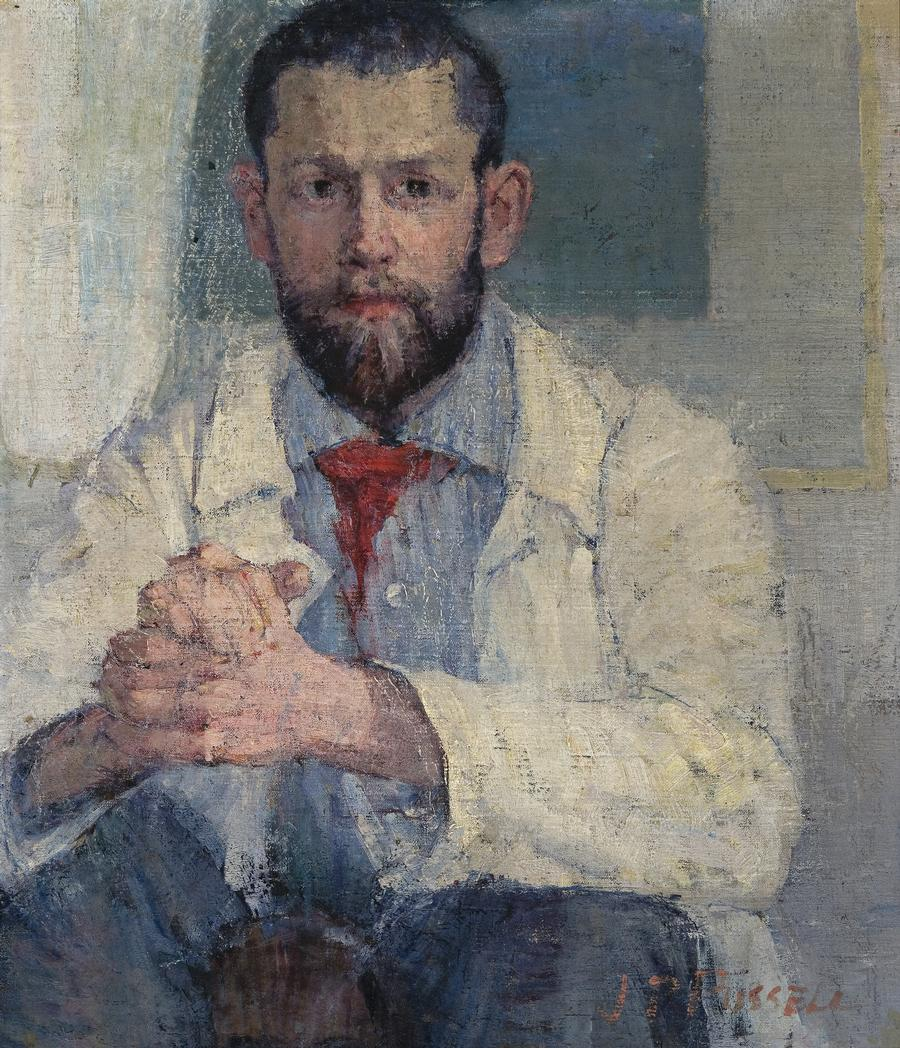
Dodge MacKnight (1860–1950)

- William Jacob Baer (d. 1941), painter
- Carl Eytel (d. 1925), landscape painter, illustrator
- John Kane (d. 1934), painter
- Dodge MacKnight (d. 1950), painter
- Arthur Frank Mathews (d. 1945), painter
- Grandma Moses (d. 1961), painter
- Iris Nampeyo (c. d. 1942), potter, ceramicist
- Anna M. Sands (d. 1927/1940), painter
- Lorado Taft (d. 1936), sculptor

=== 1861 ===
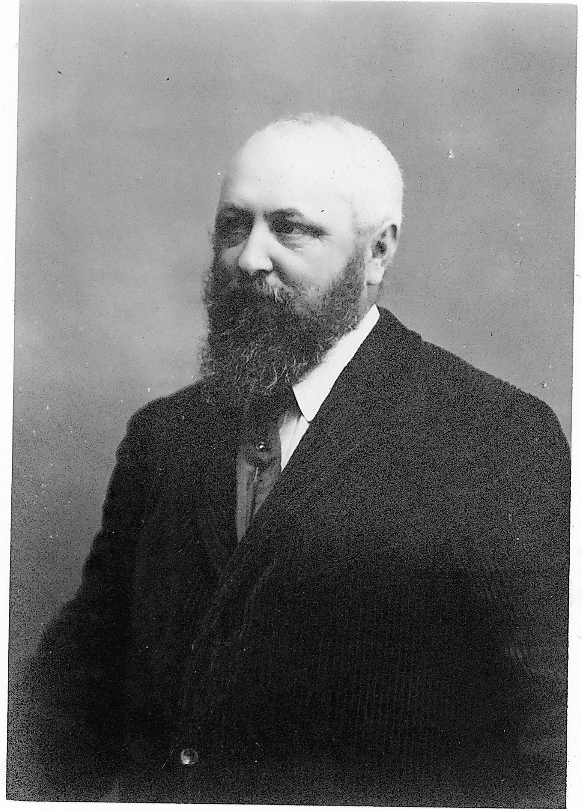
Theodore Earl Butler (1861–1936)

- Dennis Miller Bunker (d. 1890), painter
- Theodore Earl Butler (d. 1936), painter
- Charles Courtney Curran (d. 1942), painter
- D. Howard Hitchcock (d. 1943), painter
- Florence Koehler (d. 1944)
- Wilton Lockwood (d. 1914), artist
- Clara Weaver Parrish (d. 1925), painter, printmaker, stained glass designer
- Frederic Remington (d. 1909), painter, sculptor, illustrator
- Frank Rinehart (d. 1928), photographer, illustrator
- Douglas Tilden (d. 1935), sculptor

=== 1862 ===
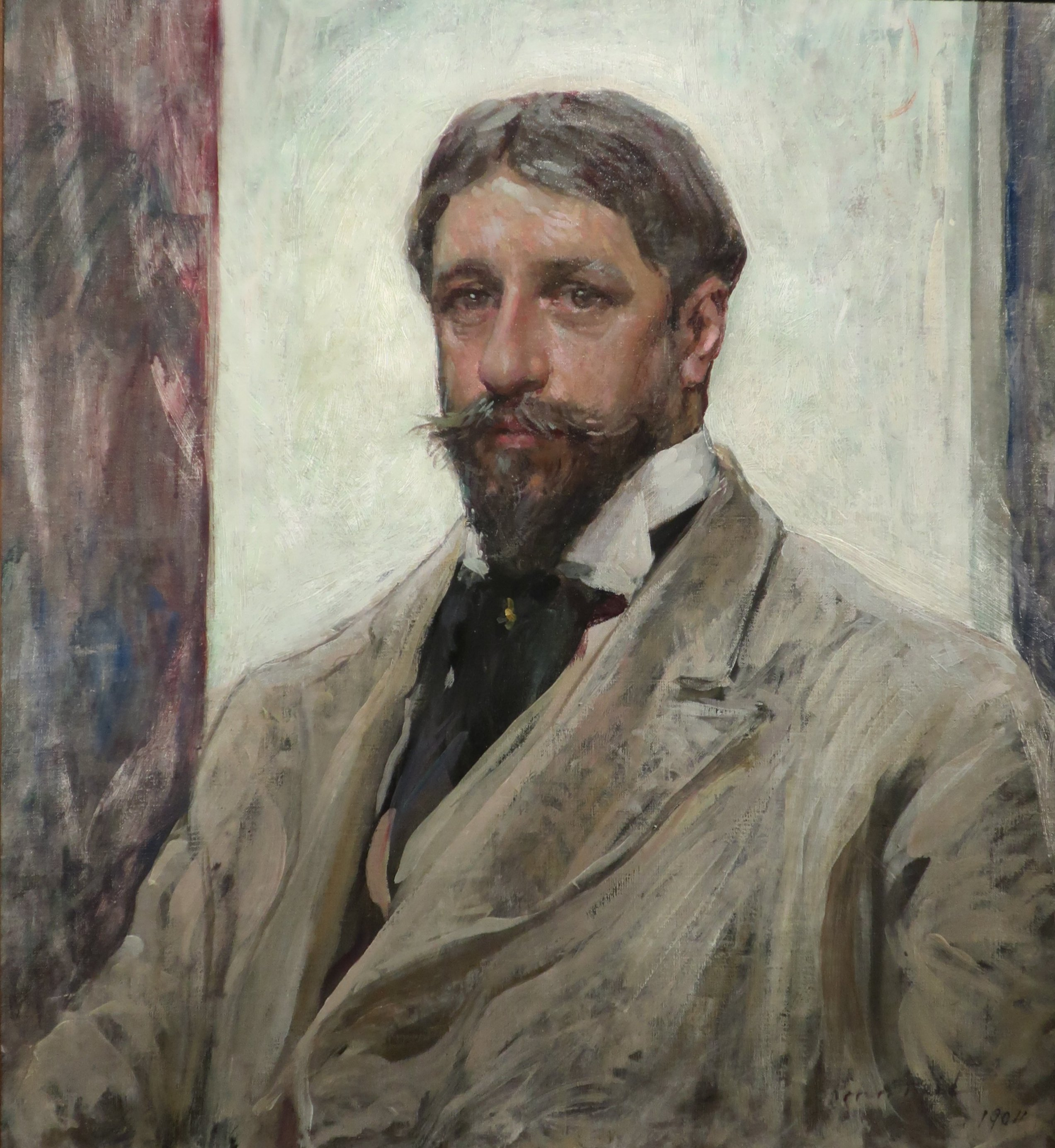
Robert Reid (1862–1929)

- Adam Emory Albright (d. 1957), painter of figures in landscapes
- Frank Weston Benson (d. 1951), painter, printmaker
- Charles Grafly (d. 1929), sculptor
- Alice De Wolf Kellogg (d. 1900), painter
- Hudson Mindell Kitchell (d. 1944), luminescent and tonalist landscapes
- Albert Pike Lucas (d. 1945), painter of landscapes, figures and portraits
- Adolfo Müller-Ury (d. 1947), Swiss-born painter
- Mina Fonda Ochtman (d. 1924), painter
- Robert Reid (d. 1929), painter, muralist
- Edmund C. Tarbell (d. 1938), painter

=== 1863 ===
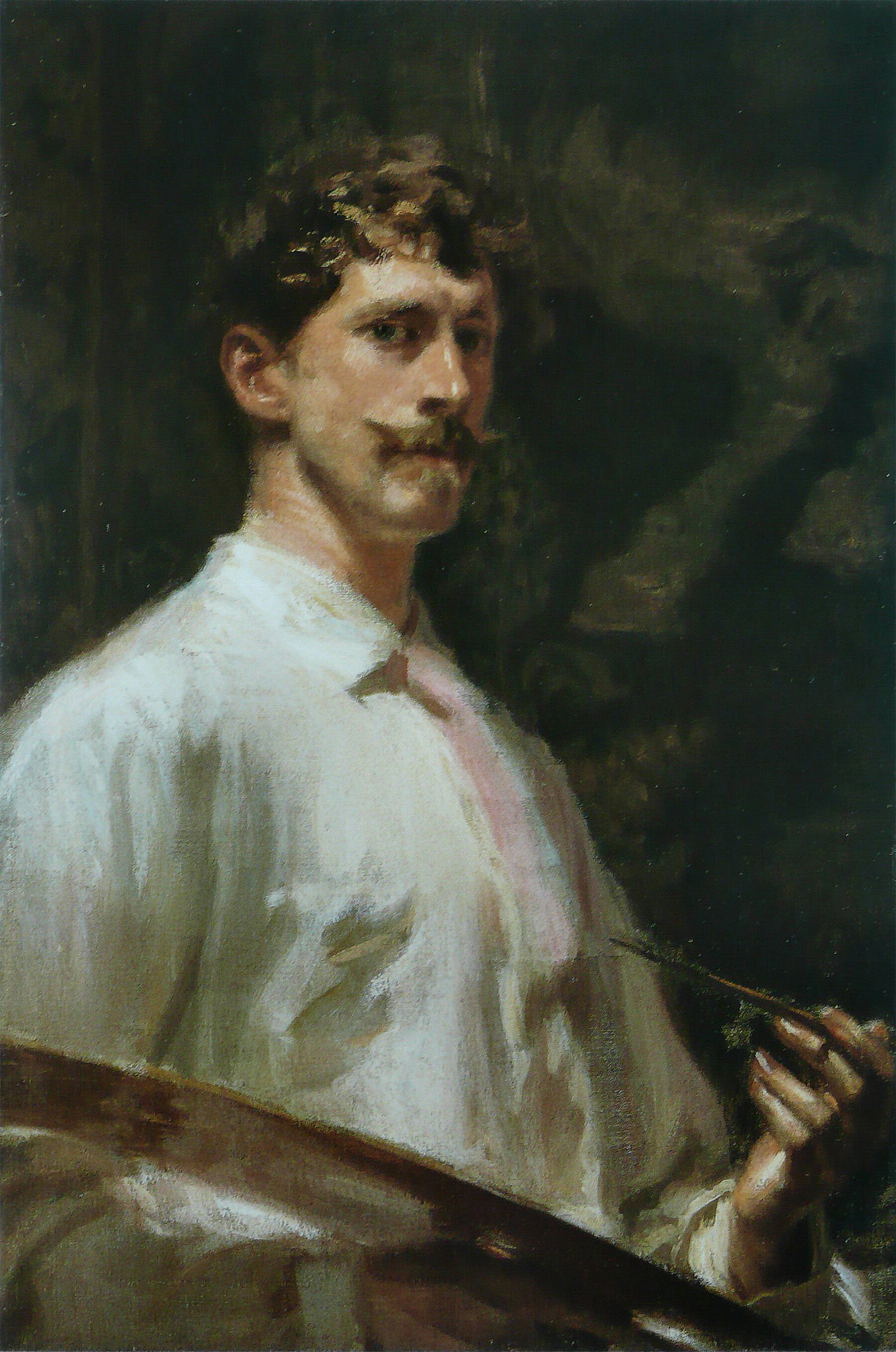
Frederick William MacMonnies (1863–1937)

- George Gray Barnard (d. 1938), sculptor
- Arthur B. Davies (d. 1928), painter, printmaker
- Frederick William MacMonnies (d. 1937), sculptor
- Verner Moore White (d. 1923), painter
- Jessie Willcox Smith (d. 1935), illustrator

=== 1864 ===
- Charles Basing (d. 1933), artist
- George Henry Bogert (d. 1944), painter
- Henry Golden Dearth (d. 1918), painter
- Louis Eilshemius (d. 1941), painter
- William Frederic Ritschel (d. 1949), German-American painter
- Charles Marion Russell (d. 1926), painter, sculptor
- Alfred Stieglitz (d. 1946), photographer
- Svend Rasmussen Svendsen (d. 1945), Norwegian-American Impressionist artist
- Charles Herbert Woodbury (d. 1940), painter

=== 1865 ===
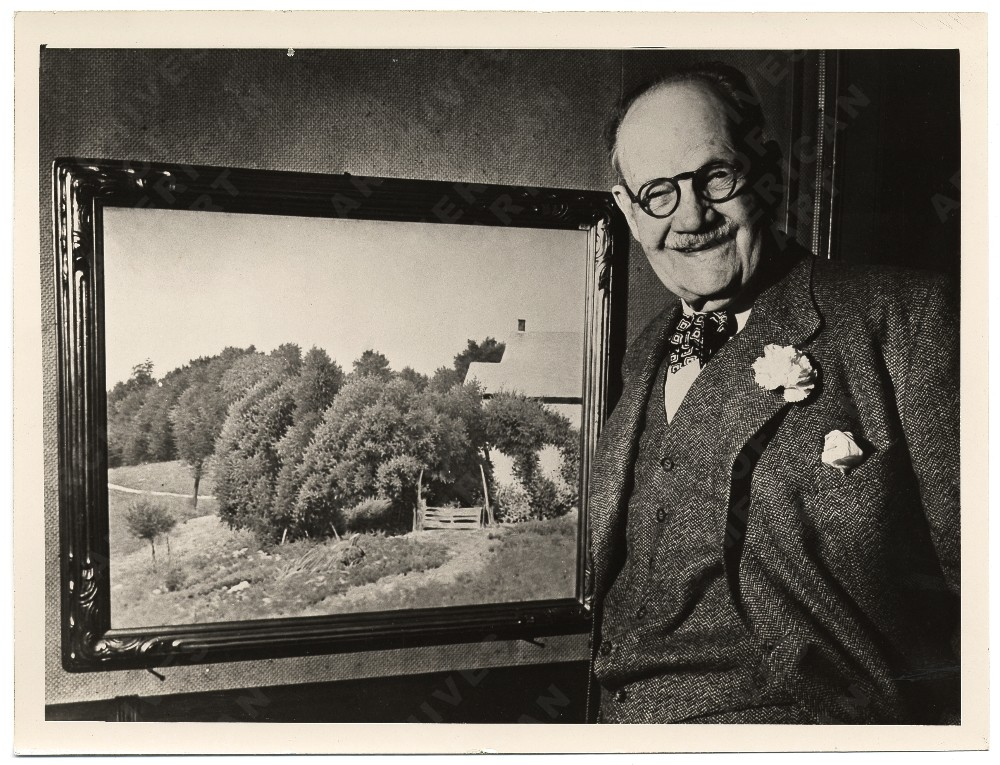
Frank Vincent DuMond (1865–1951)

- George Bridgman (d. 1943), painter
- Herbert A. Collins (d. 1937), Canadian-born landscape, portrait painter
- Thomas Cromwell Corner (d. 1938), portrait painter
- Leon Dabo (d. 1960), painter
- Frank Vincent DuMond (d. 1951), painter
- Robert Henri (d. 1929), painter
- Adelaide Alsop Robineau (d. 1929), painter, potter

=== 1866 ===
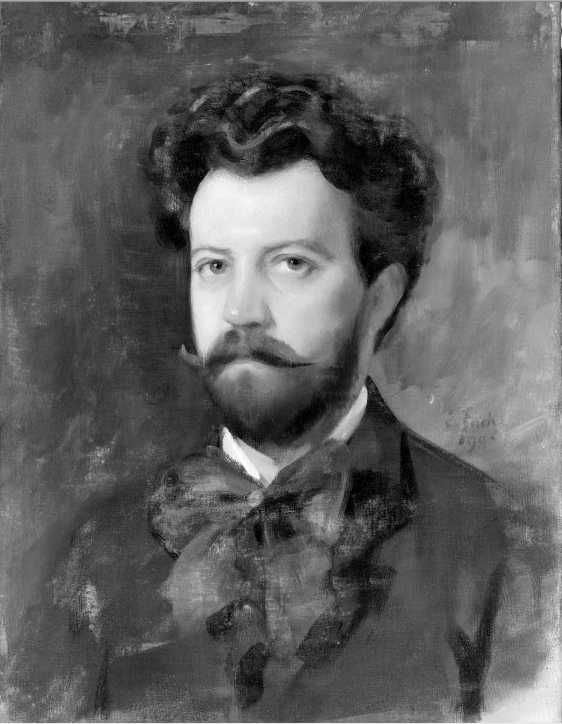
Emil Fuchs (1866–1929)

- Karl Albert Buehr (d. 1952), painter
- E. Irving Couse (d. 1935), painter, illustrator
- Helen Thomas Dranga (d. 1940), British-born painter
- Jenny Eakin Delony (d. 1949), painter
- Emil Fuchs (d. 1929), Austrian-born painter
- Arvid Nyholm (d. 1927), Swedish-American portrait and landscape artist
- Theodore Scott-Dabo (d. 1928), painter
- Henry Otto Wix (d. 1922), German-born American painter
- Art Young (d. 1943), cartoonist

=== 1867 ===
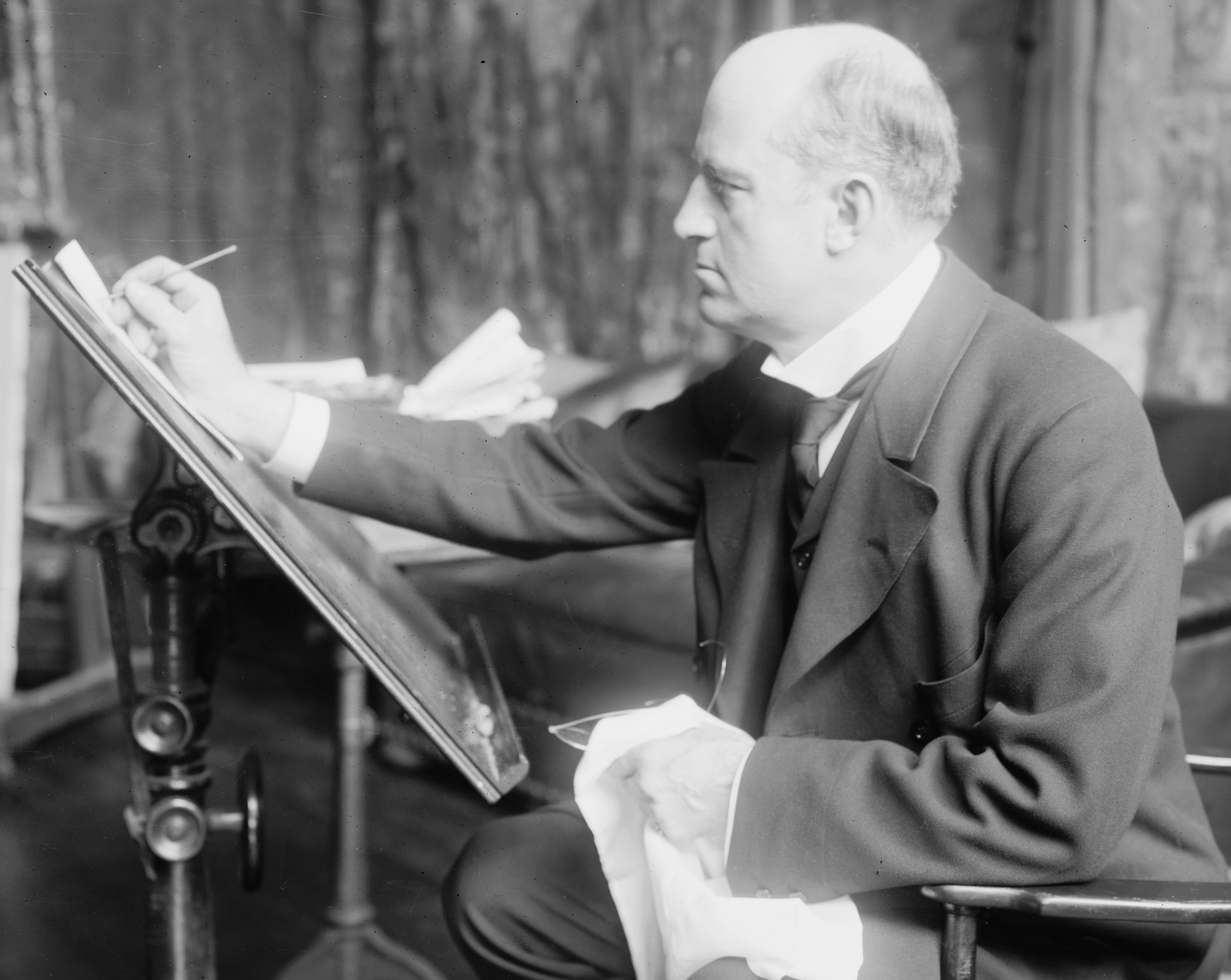
Charles Dana Gibson (1867–1944)

- Reynolds Beal (d. 1951), painter
- Oscar Florianus Bluemner (d. 1938), painter
- Gutzon Borglum (d. 1941), sculptor
- Harry Buckwalter (d. 1930), photographer, filmmaker
- Wickliffe Covington (d. 1938), painter
- Henry Brown Fuller (d. 1934), painter
- Charles Dana Gibson (d. 1944), graphic artist
- George Luks (d. 1933), painter
- Jerome Myers (d. 1940), painter
- Bela Lyon Pratt (d. 1917), sculptor
- William Sommer (d. 1949), painter
- Allen Butler Talcott (d. 1908), painter
- Frank Lloyd Wright (d. 1959), architect, innovator

=== 1868 ===
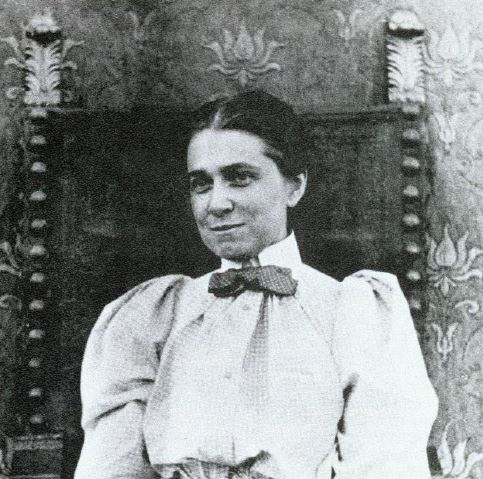
Anne Louise Gregory Ritter (1868–1929)

- Solon Borglum (d. 1922), sculptor
- Merton Clivette (d. 1931), painter
- Edward S. Curtis (d. 1952), photographer
- Nellie Huntington Gere (d. 1949), painter, illustrator
- Alfred Henry Maurer (d. 1932), painter
- Bert Geer Phillips (d. 1956), painter
- Anne Louise Gregory Ritter (d. 1929), painter, ceramicist, art teacher
- Anna Woodward (d. 1935), painter

=== 1869 ===
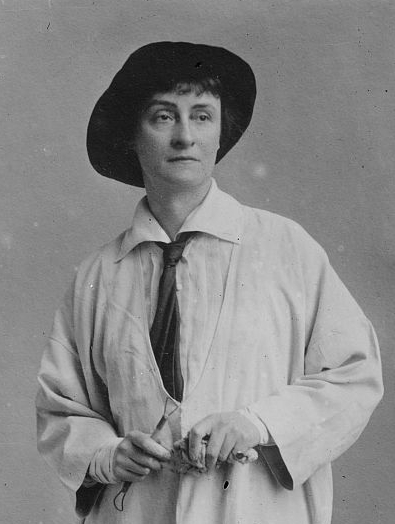
Janet Scudder (1869–1940)

- Kate Carew (d. 1961), caricaturist
- Percy Gray (d. 1952), painter
- Mary Shepard Greene (d. 1958), painter, illustrator, jewelry designer
- Charles Hopkinson (d. 1962), painter
- Wilson Irvine (d. 1936), painter
- Xavier Timoteo Martinez (d. 1943), painter
- William McGregor Paxton (d. 1941), painter
- Edward Willis Redfield (d. 1965), painter
- Janet Scudder (d. 1940), sculptor
- Harriet "Hattie" Elizabeth Wilcox (d. 1943), ceramicist

== Born 1870–1879 ==
=== 1870 ===
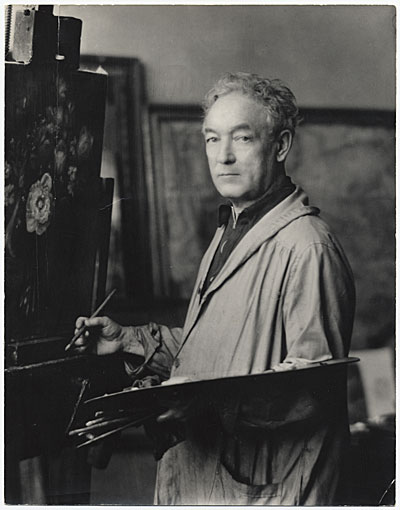
William Glackens (1870–1938)

- Thomas P. Barnett (d. 1929), painter
- Anna Richards Brewster (d. 1952), painter
- Alexander Stirling Calder (d. 1945), sculptor
- William Glackens (d. 1938), painter
- John Marin (d. 1953), painter, printmaker
- John T. McCutcheon (d. 1949), political cartoonist
- Maxfield Parrish (d. 1966), painter, illustrator
- Augustus Vincent Tack (d. 1949), painter
- Frederick Weygold (d. 1941), painter, photographer
- Adolph Alexander Weinman (d. 1952), sculptor
- Samuel Washington Weis (d. 1956), painter
- Enid Yandell (d. 1934), sculptor

=== 1871 ===
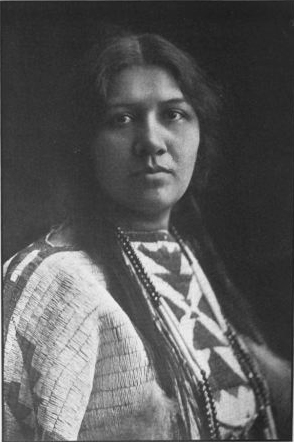
Angel De Cora (1871–1919)

- Edith Woodman Burroughs (d. 1916), sculptor
- Angel De Cora (d. 1919), painter, illustrator
- Margaret Fernie Eaton (d. 1953), artist, book plate illustrator
- Lyonel Feininger (d. 1956), printmaker
- Elizabeth Shippen Green (d. 1954), illustrator
- Albert Herter (d. 1950), painter
- Granville Redmond (d. 1935), painter
- John French Sloan (d. 1951), painter
- Edward Charles Volkert (d. 1935), painter
- Clark Voorhees (d. 1933), painter

=== 1872 ===
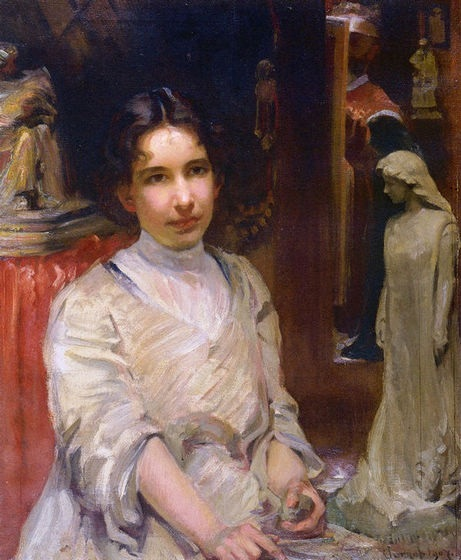
Bessie Potter Vonnoh (1872–1955)

- Charles Avery Aiken (d. 1965), painter, watercolorist
- Robert Winthrop Chanler (d. 1930), muralist
- Charles Webster Hawthorne (d. 1930), painter
- Edna Boies Hopkins (d. 1937), woodblock print artist
- Frederick Dana Marsh (d. 1961), illustrator
- George L. Viavant (d. 1925), aquascape artist
- Bessie Potter Vonnoh (d. 1955), sculptor

=== 1873 ===
- Jane Emmet de Glehn (d. 1961)
- Albert Henry Krehbiel (d. 1945), painter, muralist
- Ernest Lawson (d. 1939), Canadian-born painter
- Paul Mersereau, French-born painter
- Arthur Putnam (d. 1930), sculptor
- Juliet Thompson (d. 1956), painter
- Cordelia Wilson (d. 1953), painter

=== 1874 ===
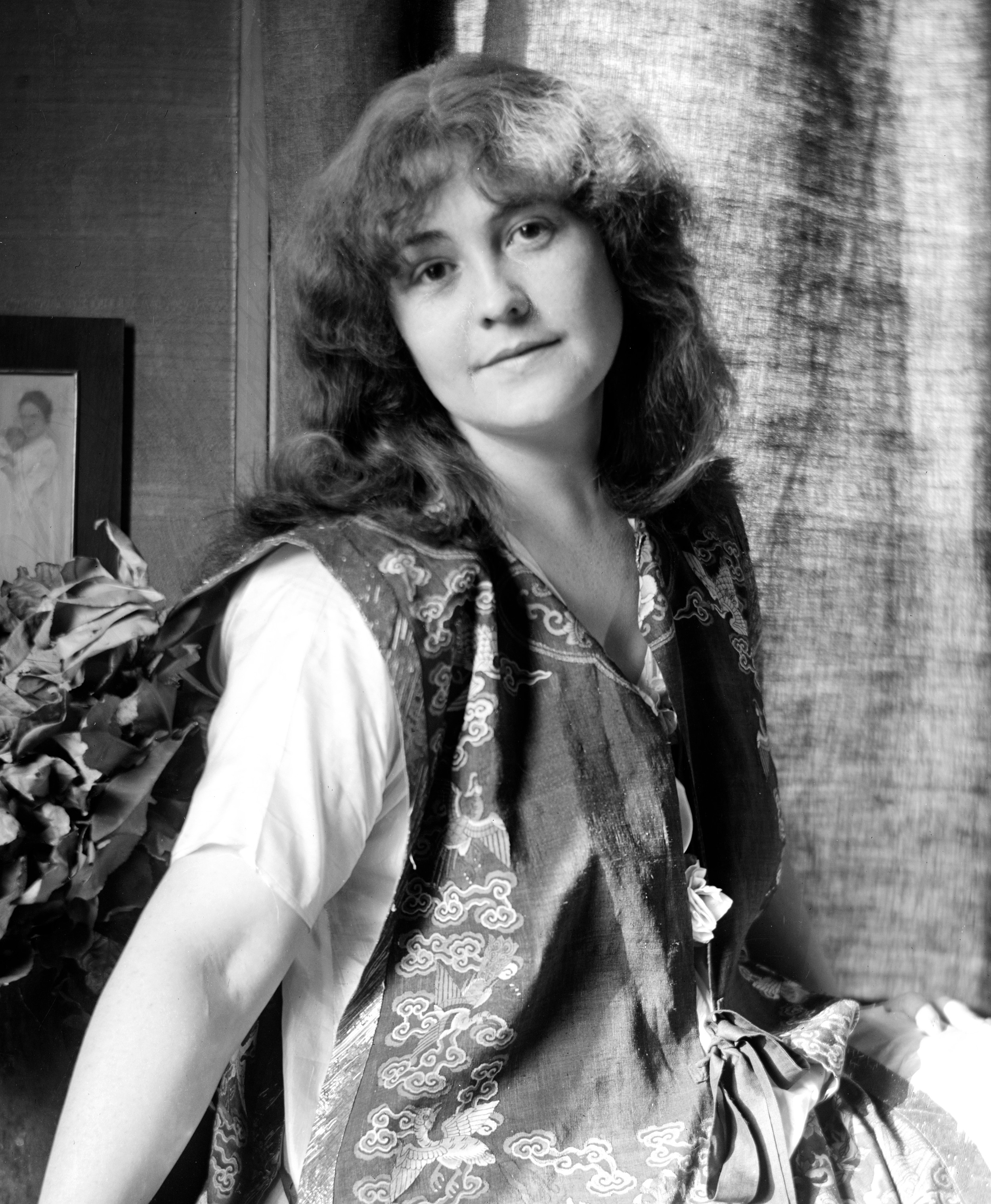
Rose O'Neill (1874–1944)

- John Wolcott Adams (d. 1925), drawing
- Ernest L. Blumenschein (d. 1960), painter
- Franklin Booth (d. 1948), illustrator
- Romaine Brooks (d. 1970), painter
- Ira J. Deen (d. 1952), artist
- Harold Heartt Foley (d. 1923), painter, collagist, illustrator
- Arnold Friedman (d. 1946), painter
- Frederick Carl Frieseke (d. 1939), painter
- Charles R. Knight (d. 1953), dinosaur artist
- Violet Oakley (d. 1961), muralist
- Rose O'Neill (d. 1944), first comic strip artist
- Hans K. Schuler (d. 1951), sculptor

=== 1875 ===
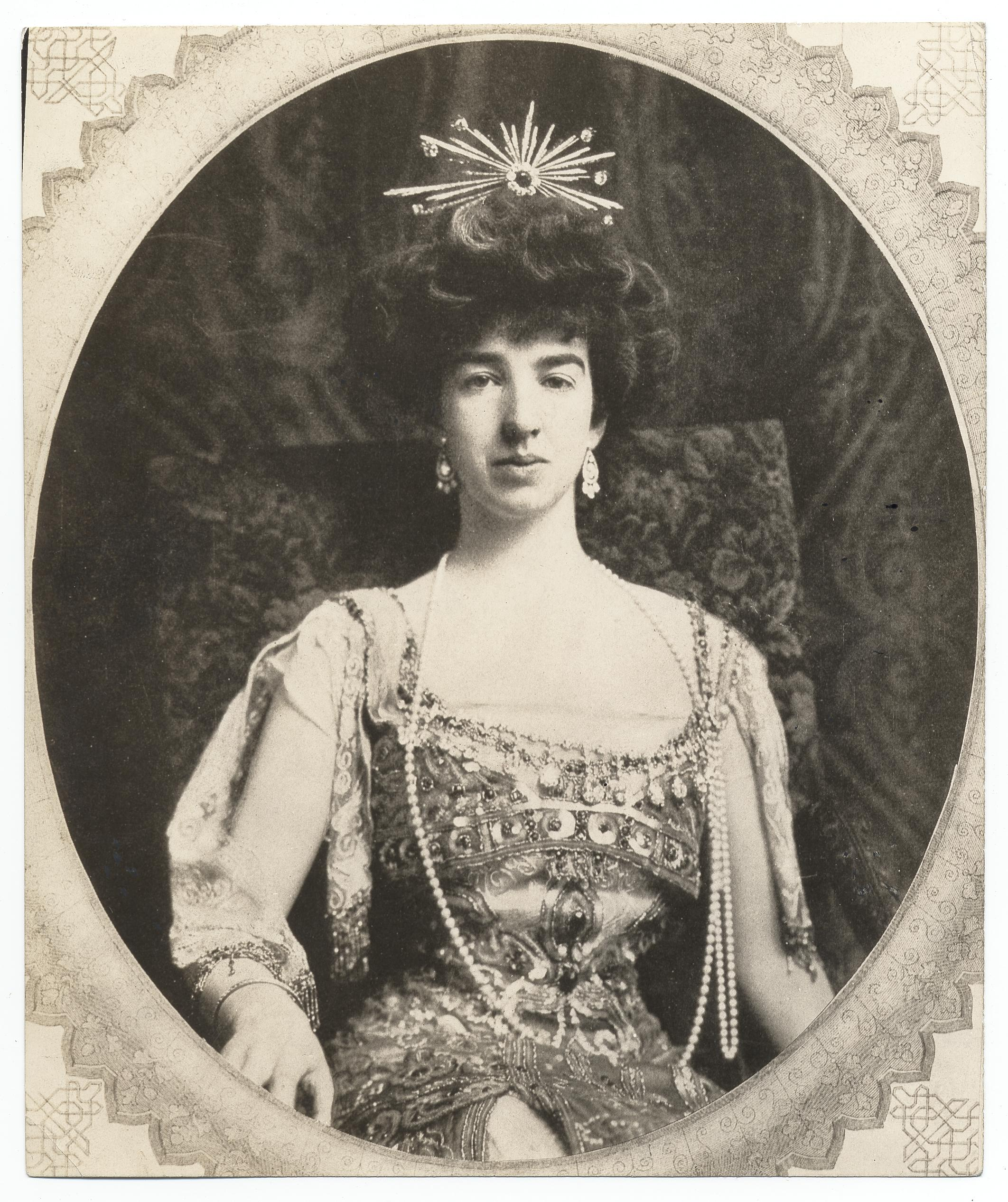
Gertrude Vanderbilt Whitney (1875–1942)

- Ethel Blanchard Collver (d. 1955), Impressionist artist, teacher
- Alice Cooper (d. 1937), sculptor
- Maynard Dixon (d. 1946), painter
- Dulah Marie Evans (d. 1951), painter, illustrator, printmaker, photographer, etcher
- Charles Keck (d. 1951), sculptor
- Marion Wachtel (d. 1951), painter
- Gertrude Vanderbilt Whitney (d. 1942), sculptor

=== 1876 ===
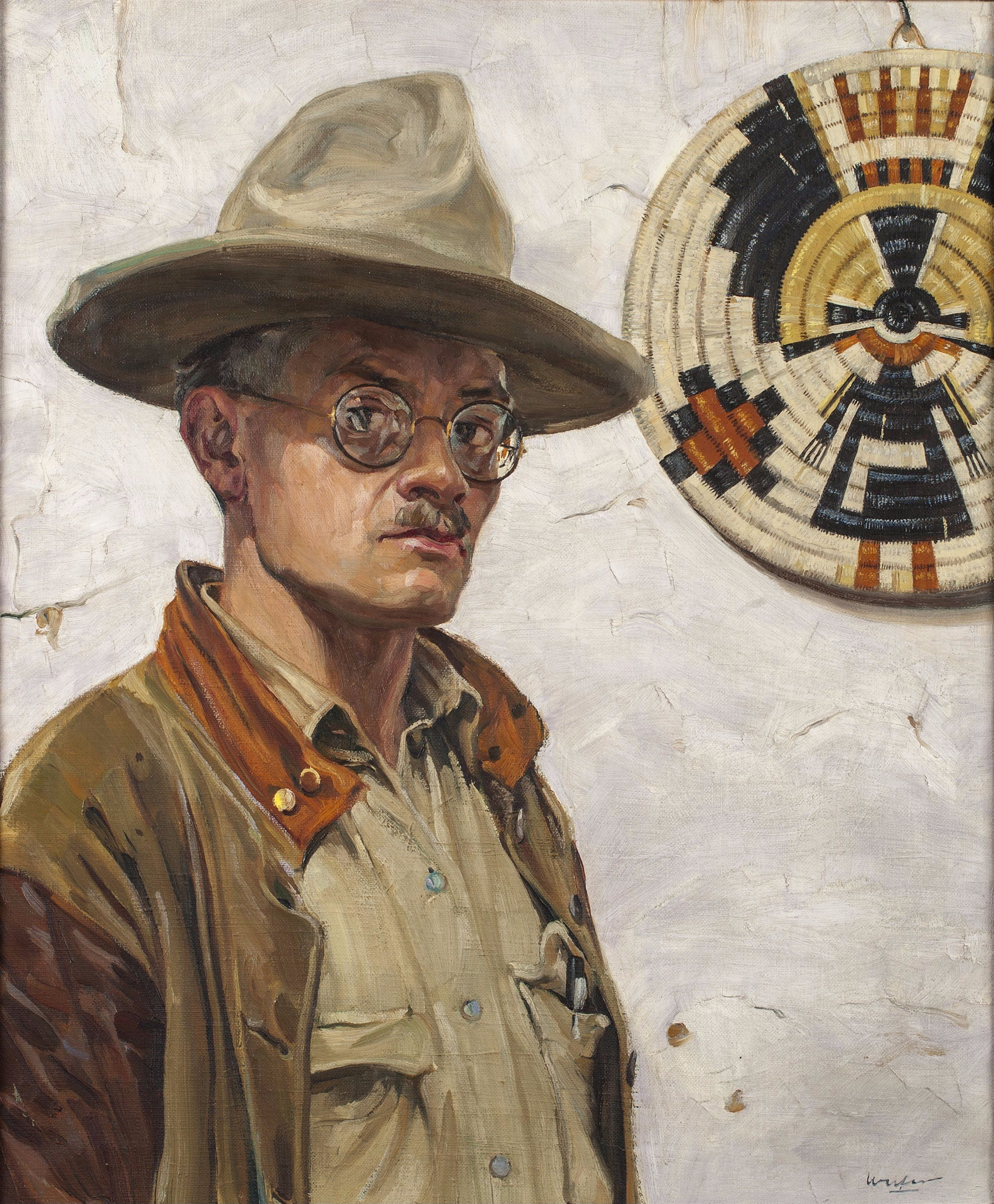
Walter Ufer (1876–1936)

- Alson S. Clark (d. 1949), painter
- Alice D. Engley Beek (d. 1951), watercolor painter
- Edith Dimock (d. 1955), painter
- Eulabee Dix (d. 1961), watercolor portrait miniatures
- James Earle Fraser (d. 1953), sculptor
- Cornelia Ellis Hildebrandt (d. 1962), painter of miniatures
- Anna Hyatt Huntington (d. 1973), sculptor
- Kenneth Hayes Miller (d. 1952), painter
- Frederick Pawla (d. 1964), painter, muralist
- Boardman Robinson (d. 1952), Canadian-American painter
- Paul R. Schumann (d. 1946), Impressionist seascapes
- Everett Shinn (d. 1953), painter, illustrator
- Walter Ufer (d. 1936), printer, illustrator
- Bessie Wheeler, painter

=== 1877 ===
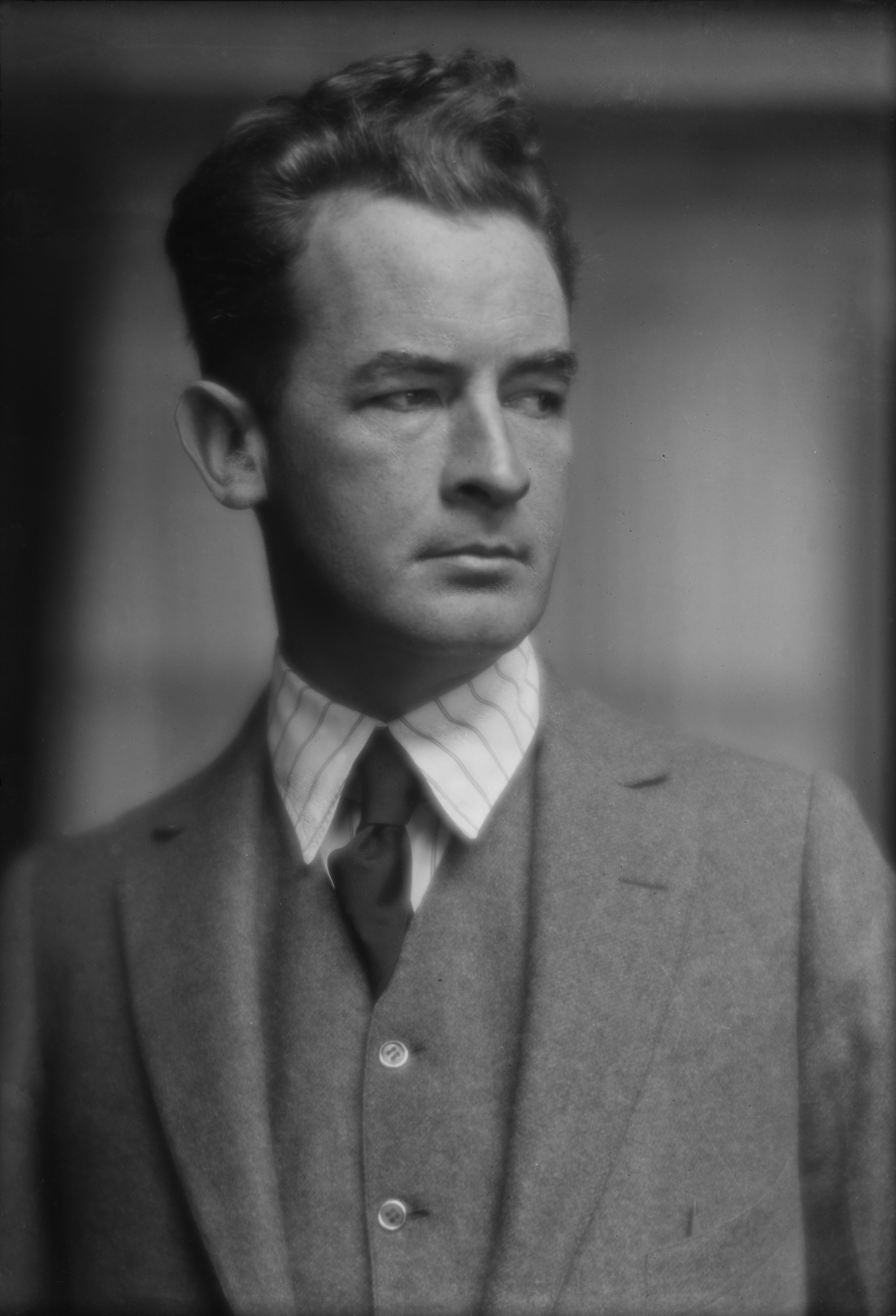
James Montgomery Flagg (1877–1960)

- Eda Nemoede Casterton (d. 1969), painter
- Rinaldo Cuneo (d. 1939), painter
- Rudolph Dirks (d. 1968), cartoonist
- Paul Dougherty (d. 1947), painter
- Katherine S. Dreier (d. 1952), painter
- James Montgomery Flagg (d. 1960), illustrator, painter
- Edmund Greacen (d. 1949), painter
- Marsden Hartley (d. 1943), painter
- William Penhallow Henderson (d. 1943), painter, architect
- Walt Kuhn (d. 1949), painter
- Mary Elizabeth Price (d. 1965)
- Joseph Stella (d. 1946), painter
- Maurice Sterne (1877/78–1957), sculptor
- Mahonri Young (d. 1957), sculptor

=== 1878 ===
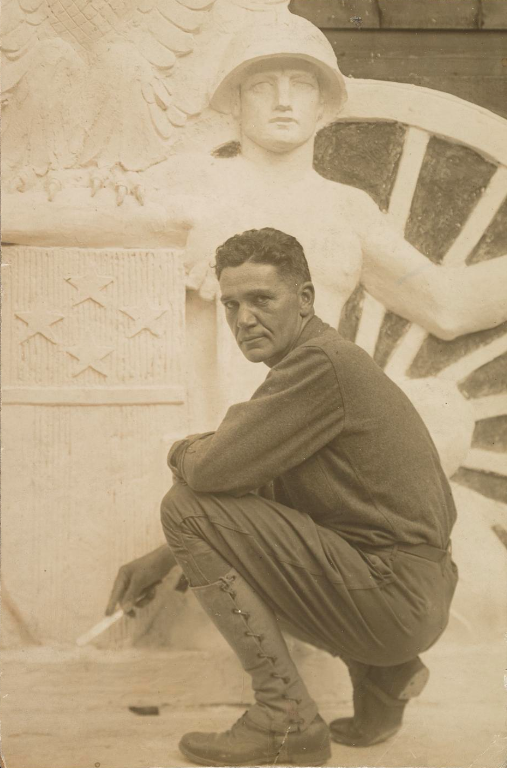
Robert Ingersoll Aitken (1878–1949)

- Robert Ingersoll Aitken (d. 1949), sculptor
- Abastenia St. Leger Eberle (d. 1942), sculptor
- Rachael Robinson Elmer (d. 1919), painter
- Wilhelmina Weber Furlong (d. 1962), still life painter
- E. William Gollings (d. 1932), western painter
- Anna Coleman Ladd (d. 1939), sculptor
- Gus Mager (d. 1956), cartoonist, illustrator, painter
- Abraham Walkowitz (d. 1965), painter

=== 1879 ===
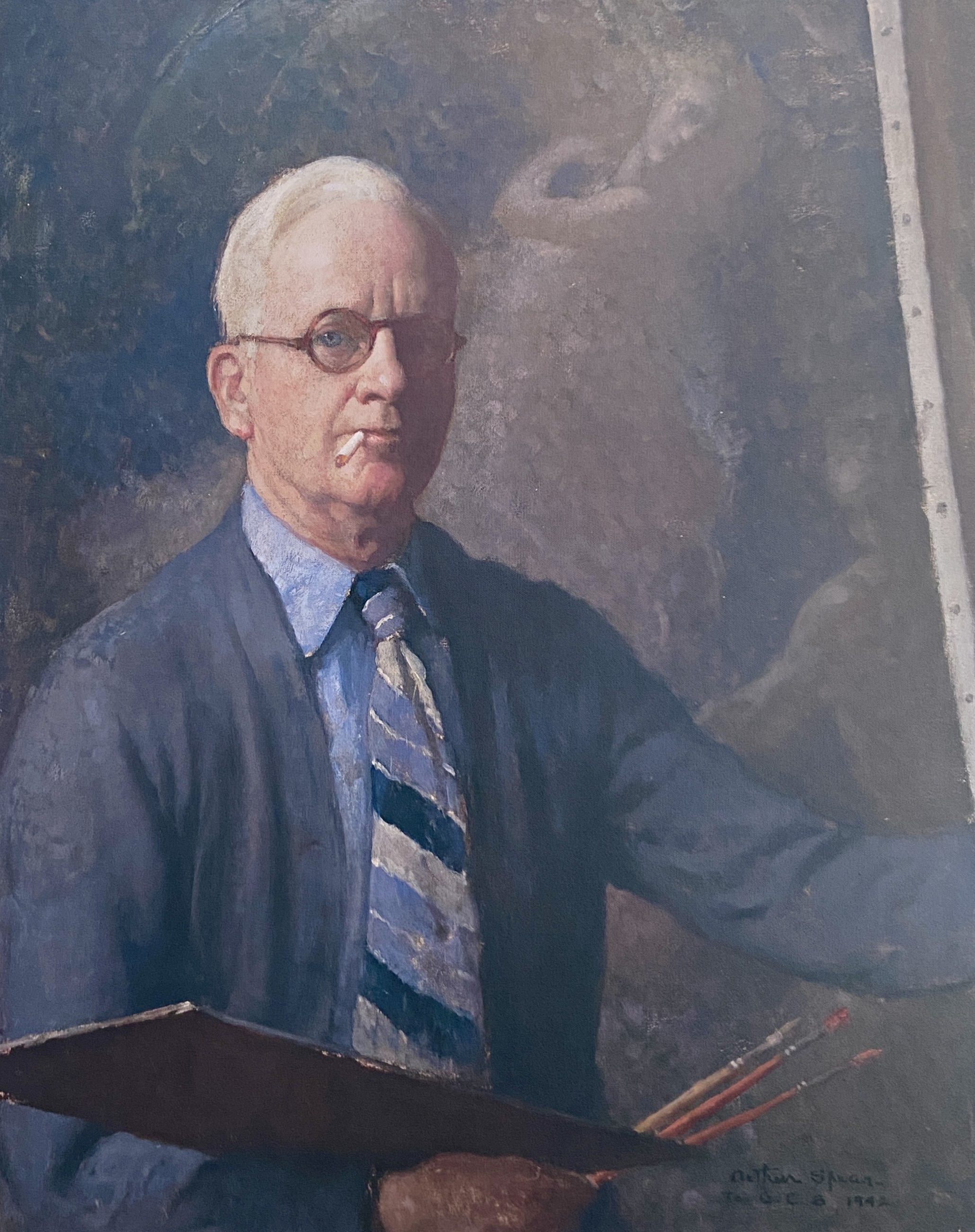
Arthur Prince Spear (1879–1959)

- Albert Abramovitz (d. 1963), painter, woodcutter
- Gifford Beal (d. 1956), painter
- Helena Smith Dayton (d. 1960), painter, sculptor
- Julian Martinez (d. 1943), potter, ceramicist
- Charles Cary Rumsey (d. 1922), sculptor
- George Demont Otis (d. 1962), landscape artist
- Arthur Prince Spear (d. 1959), imaginary and fantasy painter
- William Starkweather (d. 1969), Impressionist painter
- Edward Steichen (d. 1973), photographer, painter
- Gunnar Widforss (d. 1934), painter specializing in National Park landscapes

== Born 1880–1889 ==
=== 1880 ===
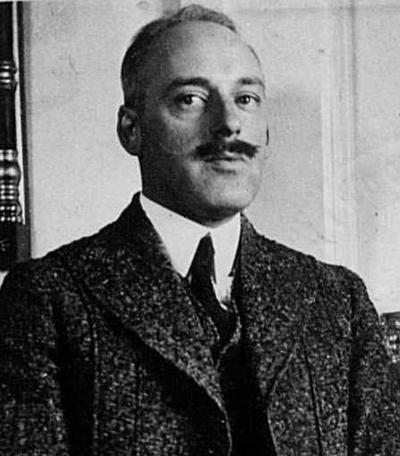
Rufus J. Dryer (1880–1937)

- Wilford Conrow (d. 1957), portrait painting
- Arthur Dove (d. 1946), painter
- Rufus J. Dryer (d. 1937), painter
- Jacob Epstein (d. 1959), sculptor
- George Herriman (d. 1944), cartoonist
- Hans Hofmann (d. 1966), painter
- Jonas Lie (d. 1940), painter

=== 1881 ===
- Gustave Baumann (d. 1971), printmaker, painter
- Chester Beach (d. 1956), sculptor
- Patrick Henry Bruce (d. 1936), painter
- Bernice Pauahi Fernow (d. 1969), miniature painter
- Agnes Lawrence Pelton (d. 1961), modernist painter
- Alfred Rudolph (d. 1942), etcher, lithographer
- Allen Tupper True (d. 1955), painter, illustrator, muralist
- Max Weber (d. 1961), painter

=== 1882 ===
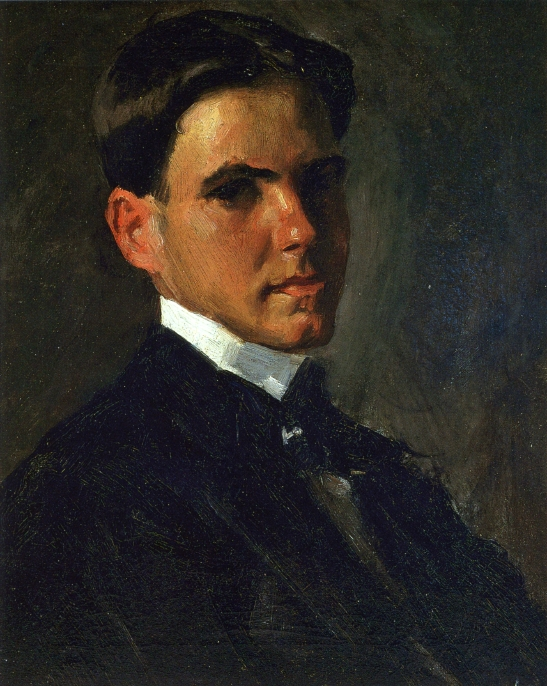
Julian Onderdonk (1882–1922)

- George Bellows (d. 1925), painter, illustrator, printmaker
- Albert Bloch (d. 1961), painter
- Arthur B. Carles (d. 1952), painter
- John Covert (d. 1960), painter
- Henri De Kruif (d. 1944), painter, illustrator, printmaker, commercial artist
- Edward Hopper (d. 1967), painter, printmaker
- Rockwell Kent (d. 1971), painter, illustrator
- Gaston Lachaise (d. 1935), French-born sculptor
- Harry Mathes (d. 1969), painter
- Elie Nadelman (d. 1946), sculptor
- Julian Onderdonk (d. 1922), painter
- James Sessions (d. 1962), artist
- Walter Pach (d. 1958), painter
- N.C. Wyeth (d. 1945), illustrator

=== 1883 ===
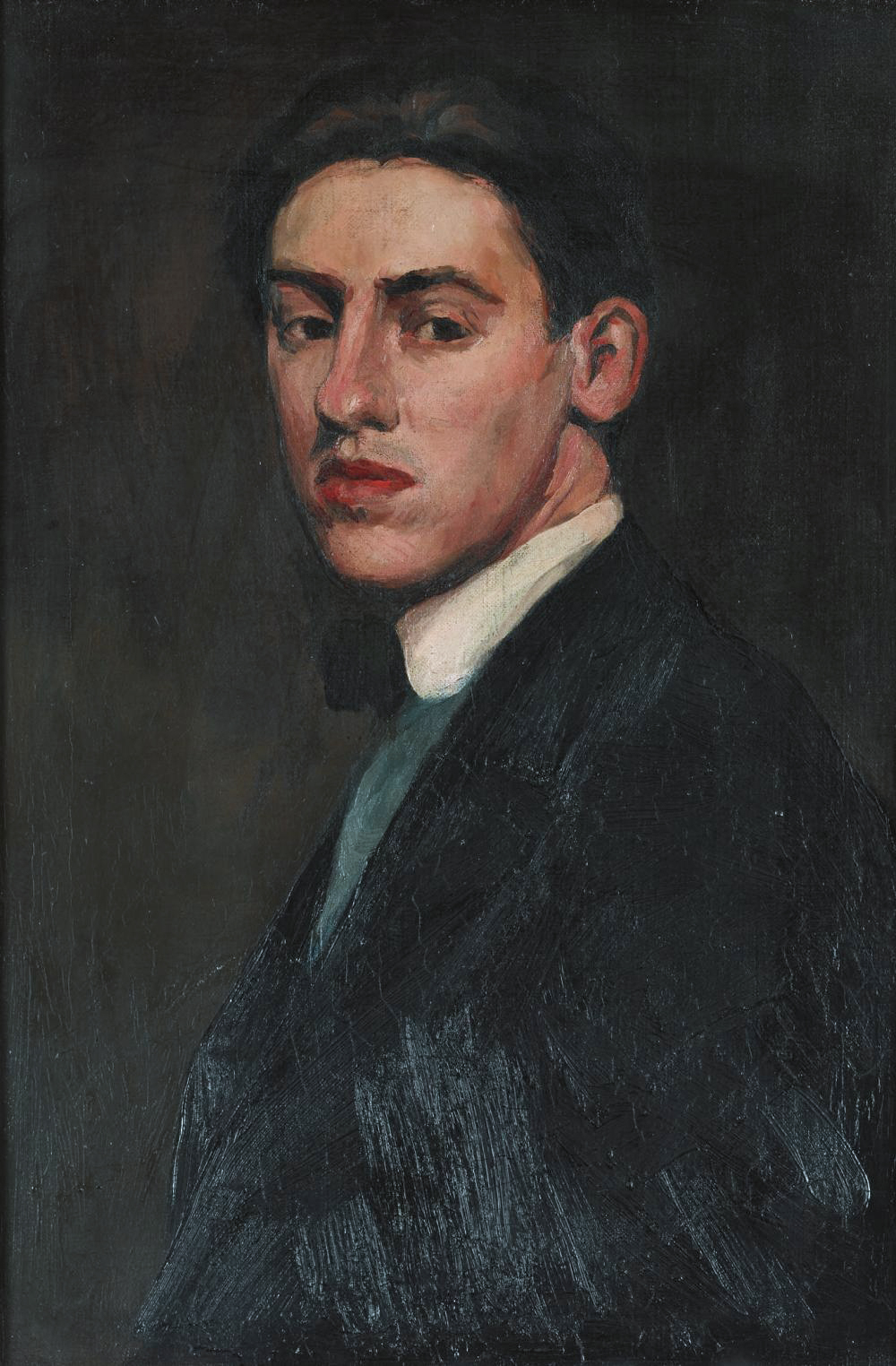
Charles Demuth (1883–1935)

- Johann Berthelsen (d. 1972), painter
- Edward William Carlson (d. 1932), miniature portraitist
- Henry B. Christian (d. 1953), painter
- Imogen Cunningham (d. 1976), photographer
- Jo Davidson (d. 1952), sculptor
- Charles Demuth (d. 1935), painter
- Rube Goldberg (d. 1970), cartoonist, inventor
- Donna N. Schuster (d. 1953), painter
- Charles Sheeler (d. 1965), painter
- Eugene Speicher (d. 1962), painter

=== 1884 ===
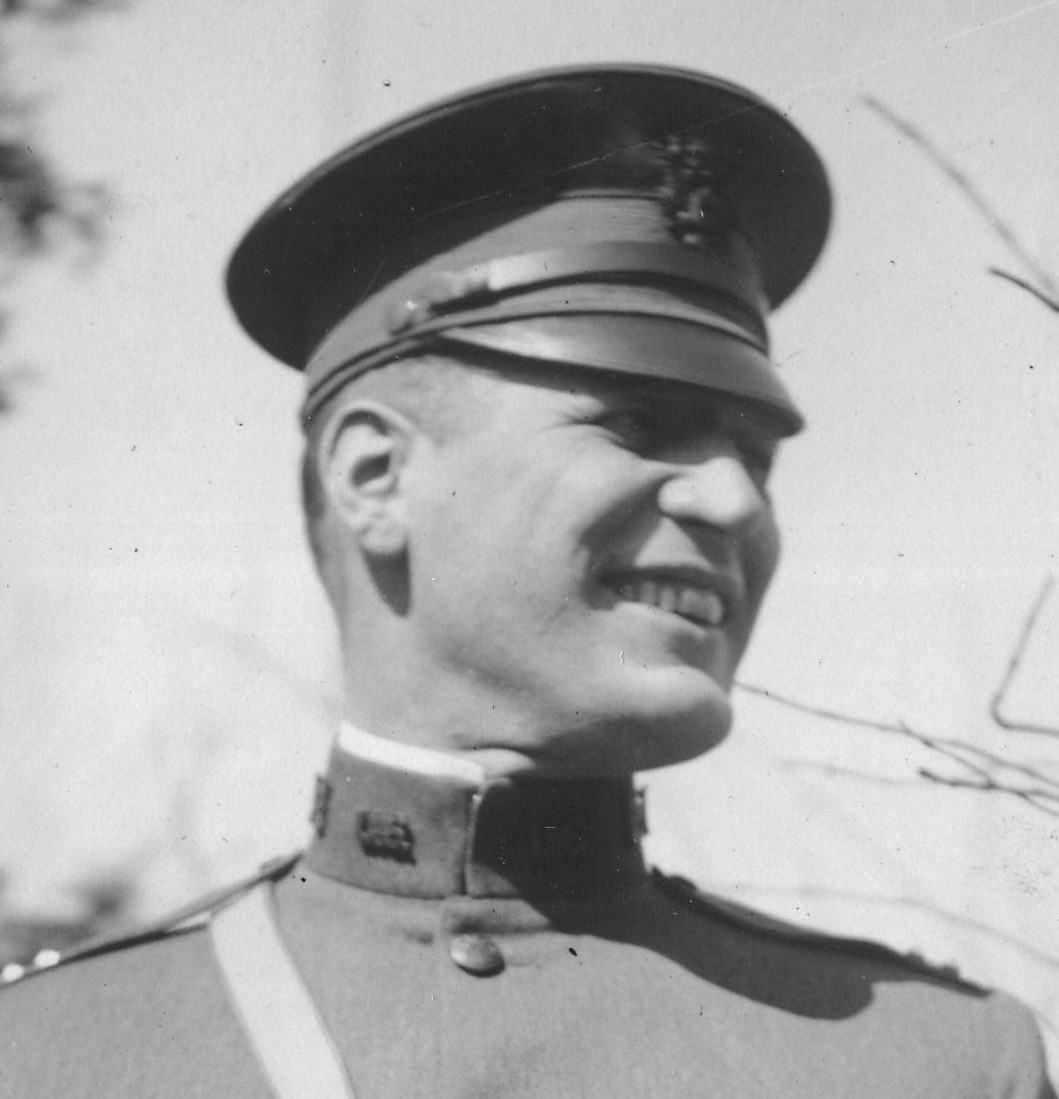
Harvey Dunn (1884–1952)

- Walter Emerson Baum (d. 1956), painter, art school founder
- Bessie Marsh Brewer (d. 1952), painter, printmaker
- Jose de Creeft (d. 1982), sculptor
- Guy Pène du Bois (d. 1958), painter
- Harvey Dunn (d. 1952), painter
- Samuel Halpert (d. 1930), painter
- William Victor Higgins (d. 1949), painter
- Leon Kroll (d. 1974), painter
- Robert Minor (d. 1952), political cartoonist
- Horatio Nelson Poole (d. 1949), painter, printmaker

=== 1885 ===
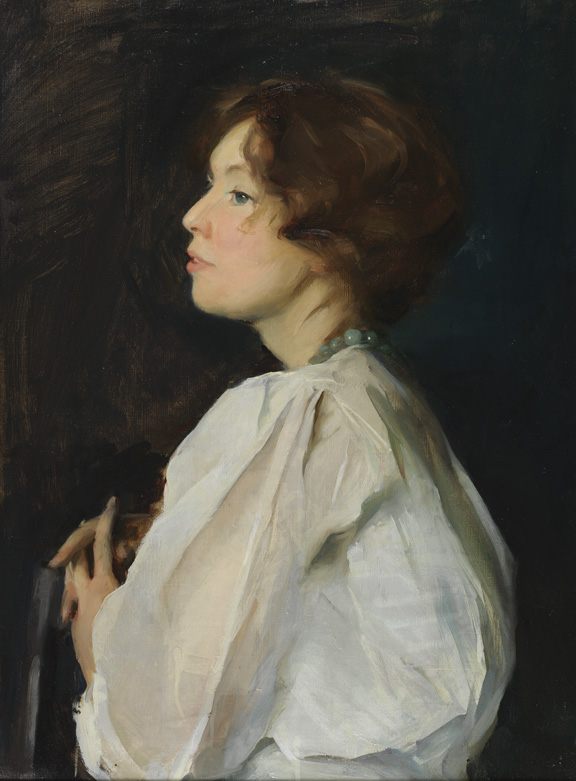
Elizabeth Sparhawk-Jones (1885–1968)

- Milton Avery (d. 1965), painter, printmaker
- Oscar Cesare (d. 1948), illustrator, cartoonist, painter
- Fred Ellis (d. 1965), political cartoonist
- E. Charlton Fortune (d. 1969), Impressionist painter
- Paul Manship (d. 1966), sculptor
- Josephine Paddock (d. 1964)
- Jules Pascin (d. 1930), Bulgarian-born painter
- Sophy Regensburg (d. 1974), naïve painter
- Elizabeth Sparhawk-Jones (d. 1968), painter
- Ralph Ward Stackpole (d. 1973), sculptor
- John Storrs (d. 1956), sculptor
- E. Oscar Thalinger (d. 1965), painter
- Nina B. Ward (d. 1944), painter

=== 1886 ===
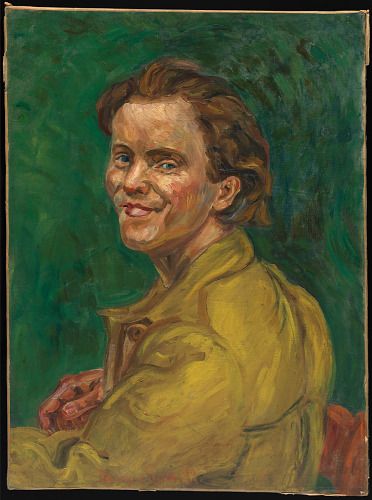
Morgan Russell (1886–1953)

- Pauline Boumphrey (d. 1959), sculptor
- Paul Burlin (d. 1969), painter
- Elias Goldberg (d. 1978), painter
- John R. Grabach (d. 1981), painter
- John D. Graham (d. 1961), painter
- Aldro Hibbard (d. 1972), painter
- Frederick Kann (d. 1965), painter
- Charles James Martin (d. 1955), painter
- Morgan Russell (d. 1953), painter
- Joseph Tepper (d. 1977), portrait painter
- Edward Weston (d. 1958), photographer
- Mary Agnes Yerkes (d. 1989), painter

=== 1887 ===
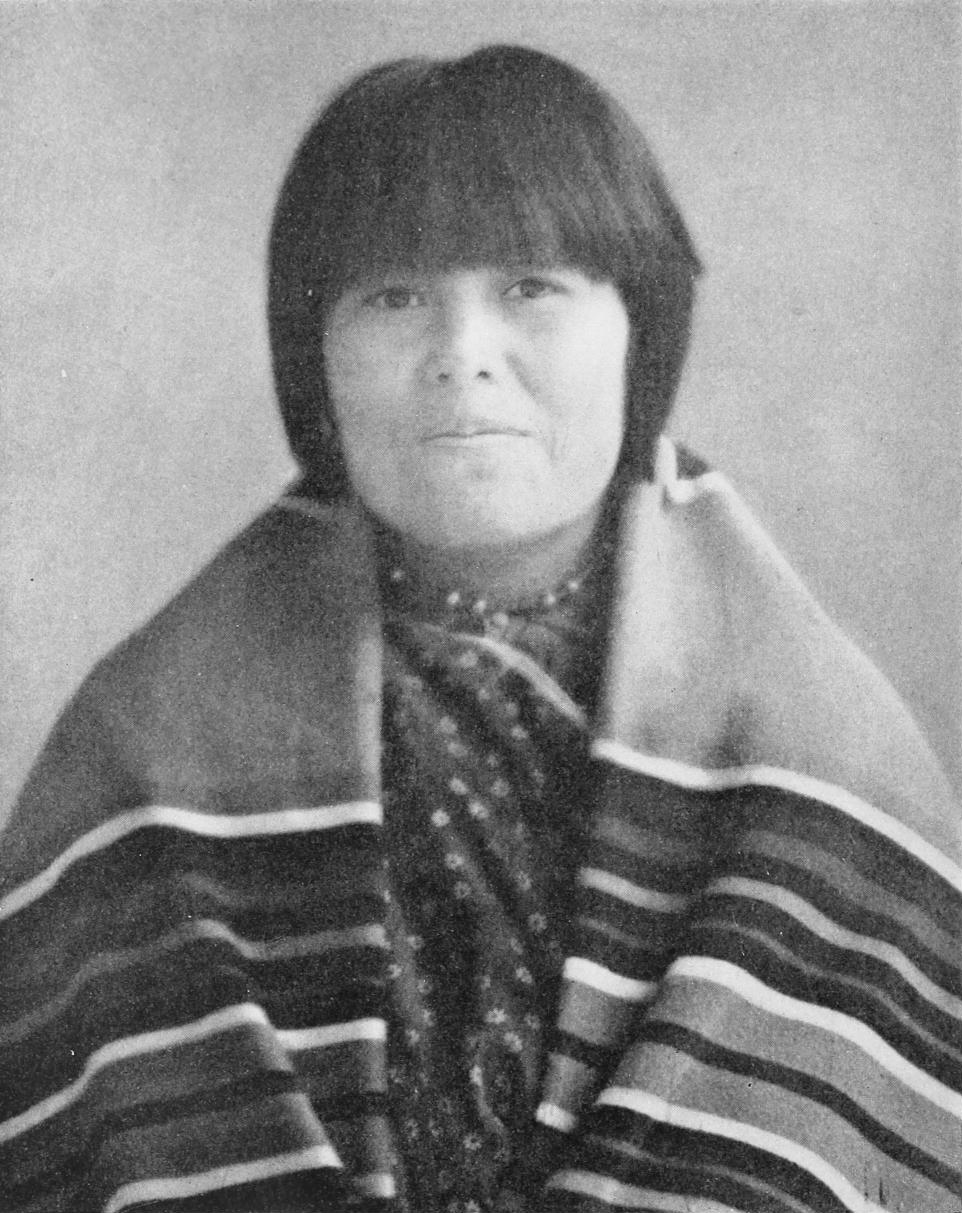
Maria Martinez (1887–1980)

- Sam Charles (d. 1949), painter
- Andrew Dasburg (d. 1979), painter
- Manierre Dawson (d. 1969), painter
- Marcel Duchamp (d. 1968), French-born painter, sculptor
- Louis Grell (d. 1960), painter, muralist
- Maria Martinez (d. 1980), potter, ceramicist
- Georgia O'Keeffe (d. 1986), painter
- John C. Poole (d. 1926), etcher, wood engraver
- Claggett Wilson (d. 1952), painter
- Marguerite Zorach (d. 1968), painter
- William Zorach (d. 1966), sculptor

=== 1888 ===
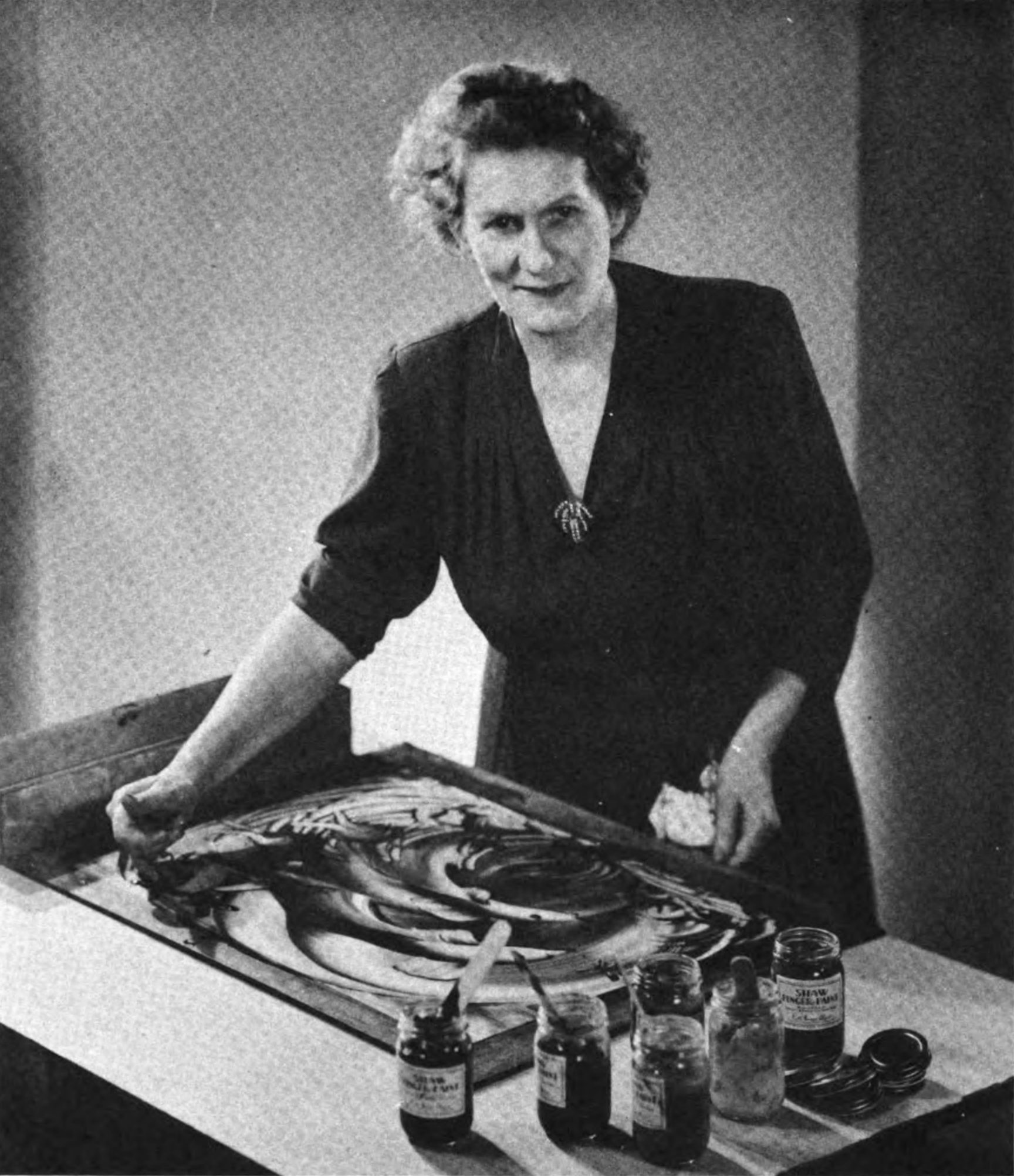
Ruth Faison Shaw (1888–1969)

- Josef Albers (d. 1976), painter
- William Spencer Bagdatopoulos (d. 1965), painter, commercial artist
- Arnold Franz Brasz (d. 1966), painter, sculptor, printmaker
- Mountfort Coolidge (d. 1954), painter, antiquarian
- Augustus Dunbier (d. 1977), painter
- Gerald Murphy (d. 1967), painter
- Bonita Wa Wa Calachaw Nuñez (d. 1972), Native American artist
- William Robert Pearmain (d. 1912), painter
- Horace Pippin (d. 1946), painter
- Ruth Faison Shaw (d. 1969), painter

=== 1889 ===
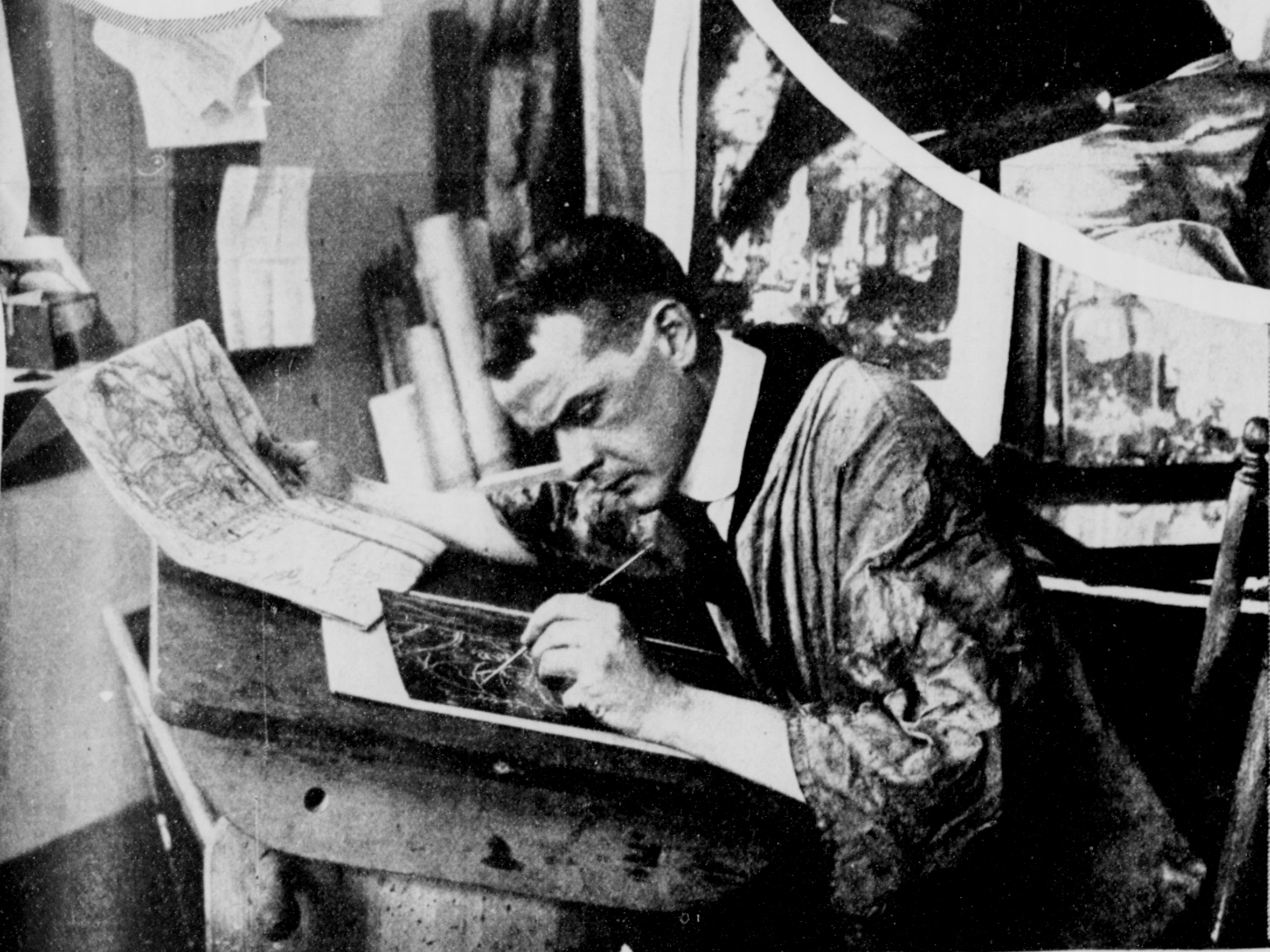
James Daugherty (1889–1974)

- Maurice Becker (d. 1975), political cartoonist, illustrator
- Thomas Hart Benton (d. 1975), painter, muralist, printmaker
- James Daugherty (d. 1974), painter, illustrator
- Laura Gardin Fraser (d. 1966), sculptor
- Gleb Ilyin (d. 1968), Russian-born portrait, landscape painter
- Geneva Mercer (d. 1984), sculptor
- Edna Cooke Shoemaker (d. 1975), illustrator
- Robert William Wood (d. 1979), painter

== Born 1890–1899 ==
=== 1890 ===
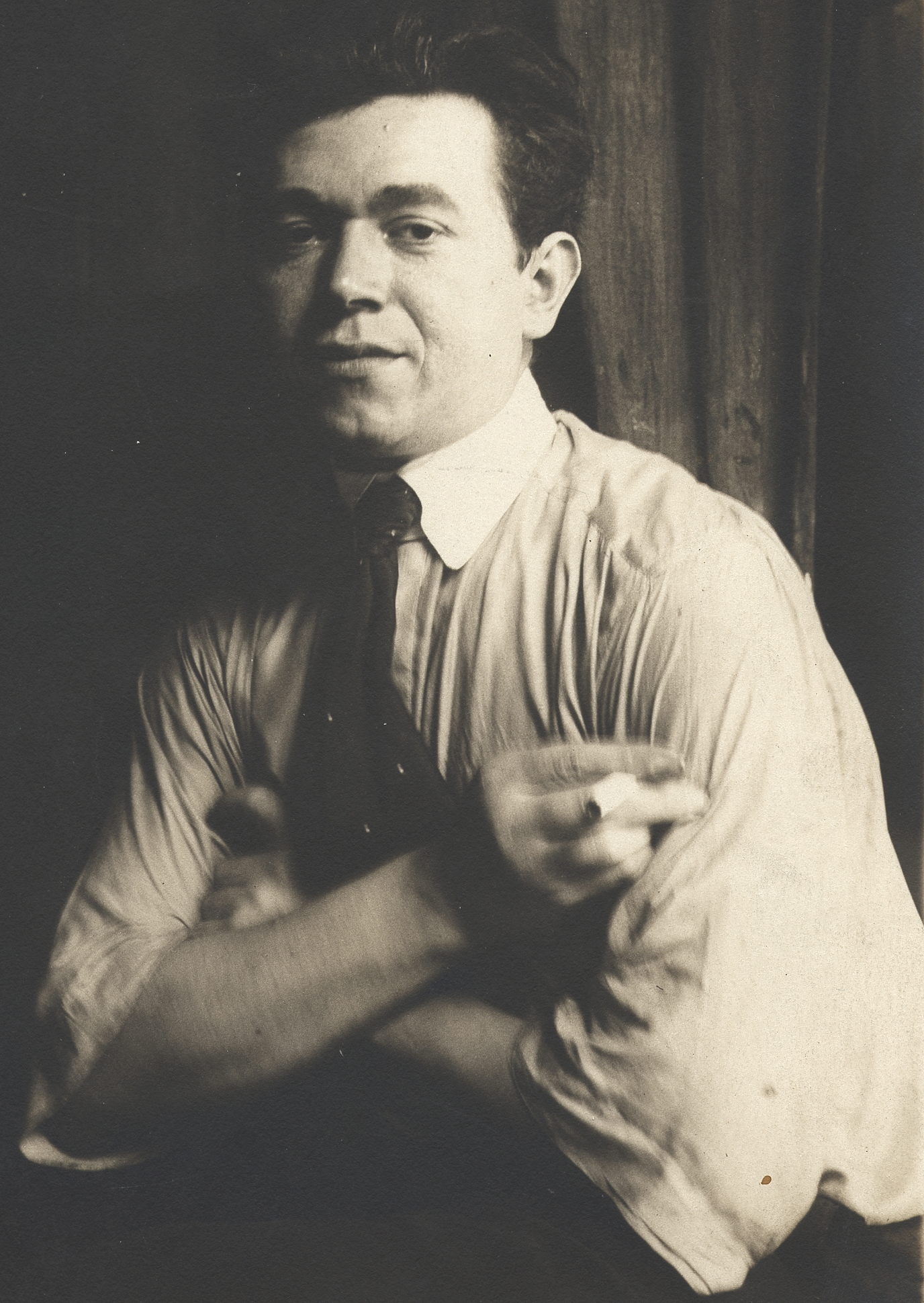
Jan Matulka (1890–1972)

- Grace Albee (d. 1985), printmaker
- Theresa Bernstein (d. 2002), artist, painter, writer
- Gerald Curtis Delano (d. 1972), painter
- Leo Friedlander (d. 1966), sculptor
- Frances Cranmer Greenman (d. 1981), portrait painter
- Frederick Kiesler (d. 1965), Austrian-born sculptor, designer
- Robert Laurent (d. 1970), sculptor
- Stanton Macdonald-Wright (d. 1973), painter
- Jan Matulka (d. 1972), painter
- Man Ray (d. 1976), photographer, dadaist
- Paul Strand (d. 1976), photographer
- Mark Tobey (d. 1976), painter

=== 1891 ===
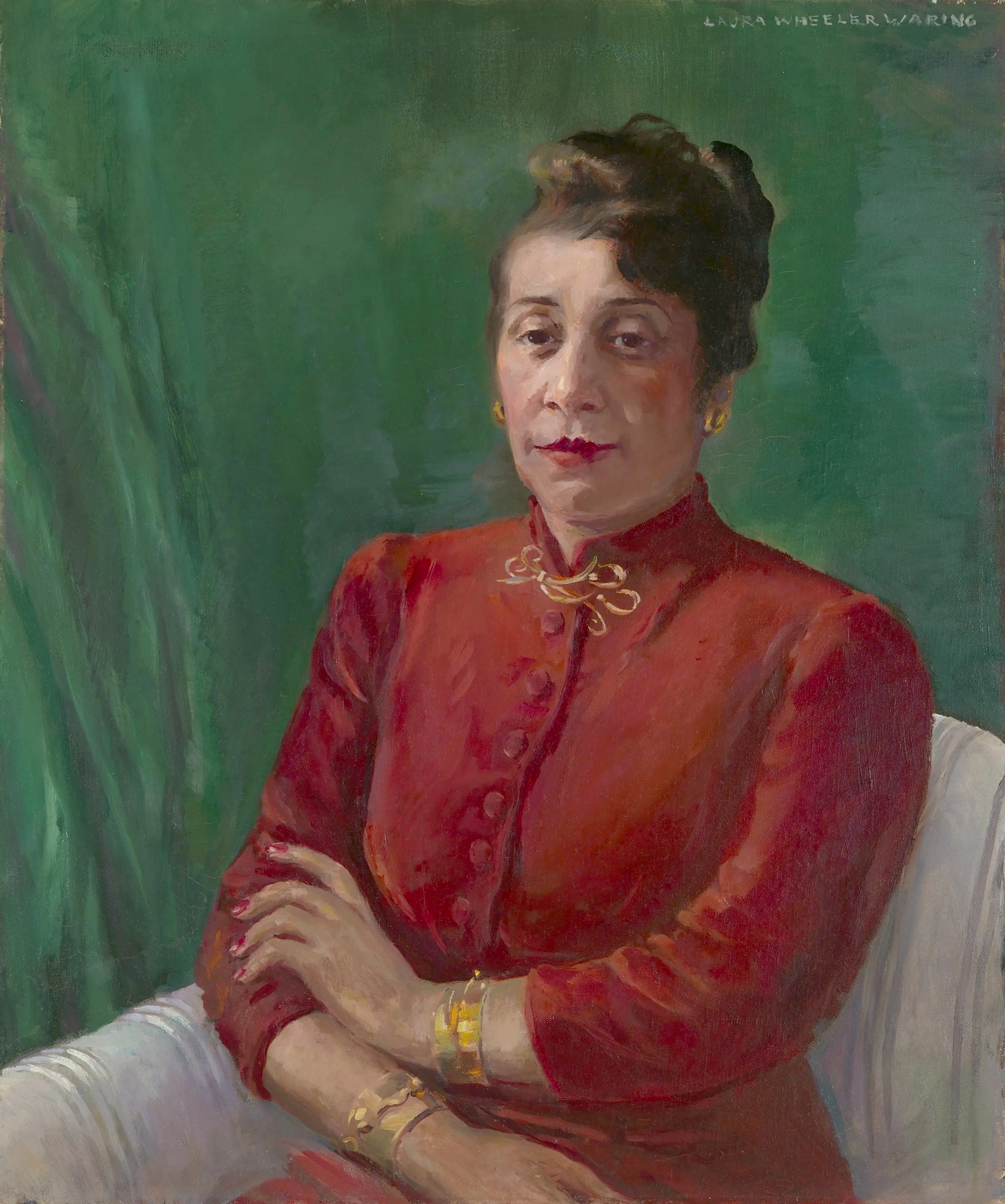
Alma Woodsey Thomas (1891–1978)

- Mabel Alvarez (d. 1985), painter
- George Ault (d. 1948), painter
- McClelland Barclay (d. 1942), illustrator, pin-up artist
- Francis Focer Brown (d. 1971), painter
- Arthur N. Christie (d. 1980), painter
- Edwin Dickinson (d. 1978), painter
- Robert Lee Eskridge (d. 1975), painter
- Genevieve Springston Lynch (d. 1960), painter
- Justin McCarthy (d. 1977), self-taught painter
- Alma Woodsey Thomas (d. 1978), painter
- Jennings Tofel (d. 1959), Polish-born painter
- Grant Wood (d. 1942), painter

=== 1892 ===
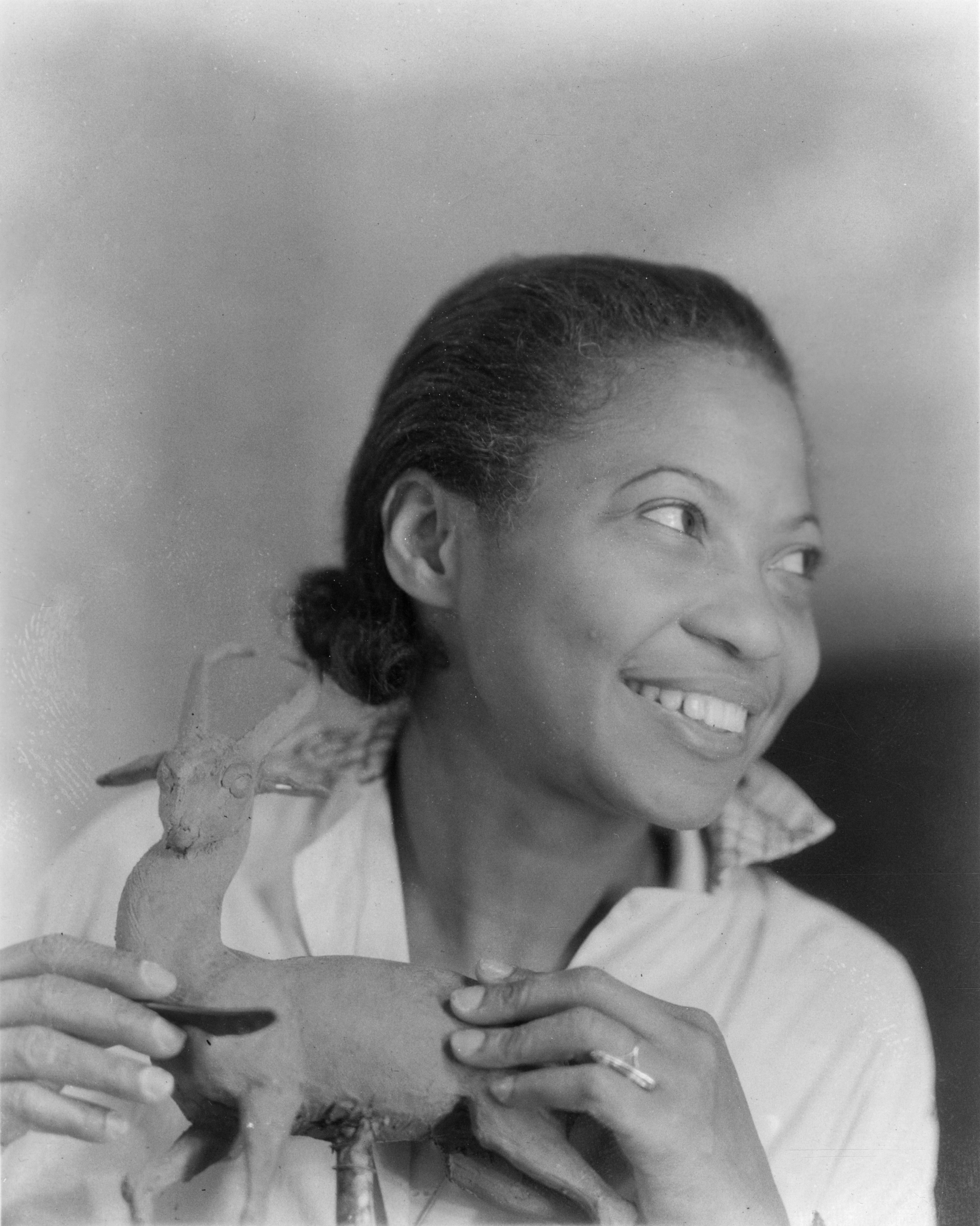
Augusta Savage (1892–1962)

- Ralph Pallen Coleman (d. 1968), painter, illustrator
- Hugo Gellert (d. 1985), illustrator, muralist
- Naomi Polk (d. 1984), watercolor artist, poet
- Augusta Savage (d. 1962), sculptor, teacher
- Vaclav Vytlacil (d. 1984), painter, teacher
- John Ellsworth Weis (d. 1962), painter
- Winslow Wilson (d. 1974), painter, teacher

=== 1893 ===
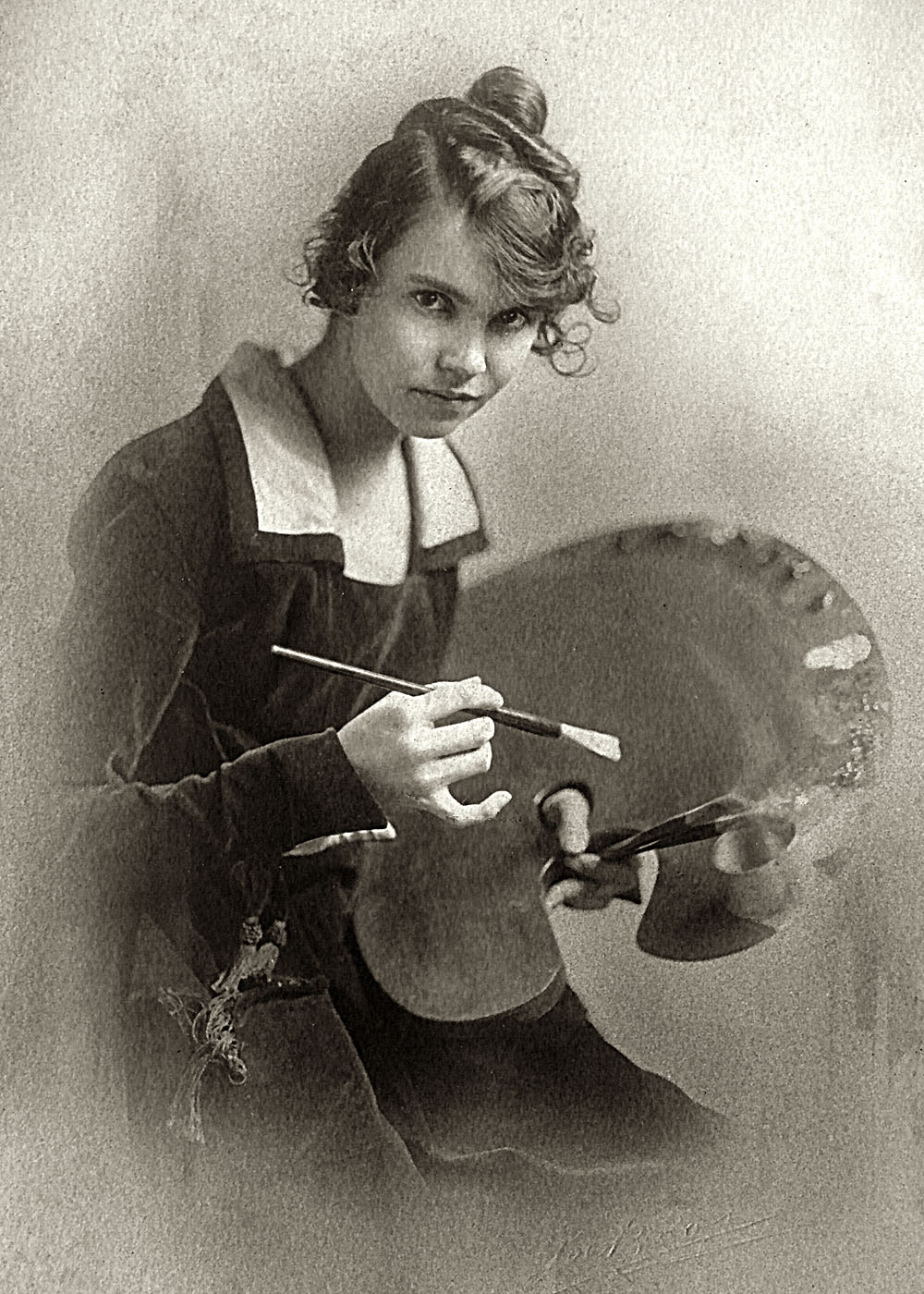
Wanda Gág (1893–1946)

- Charles E. Burchfield (d. 1967), painter
- Rene Paul Chambellan (d. 1955), sculptor
- Pál Fried (d. 1976), oil painter, dancers, nudes, portraits
- Wanda Gág (d. 1946), printmaker, illustrator
- George Albert Gale (d. 1951), nautical-themed artist
- R. H. Ives Gammell (d. 1981), painter
- Yasuo Kuniyoshi (d. 1953), painter
- Bernard E. Peters (d. 1949), painter
- Abraham Rattner (d. 1978), painter

=== 1894 ===
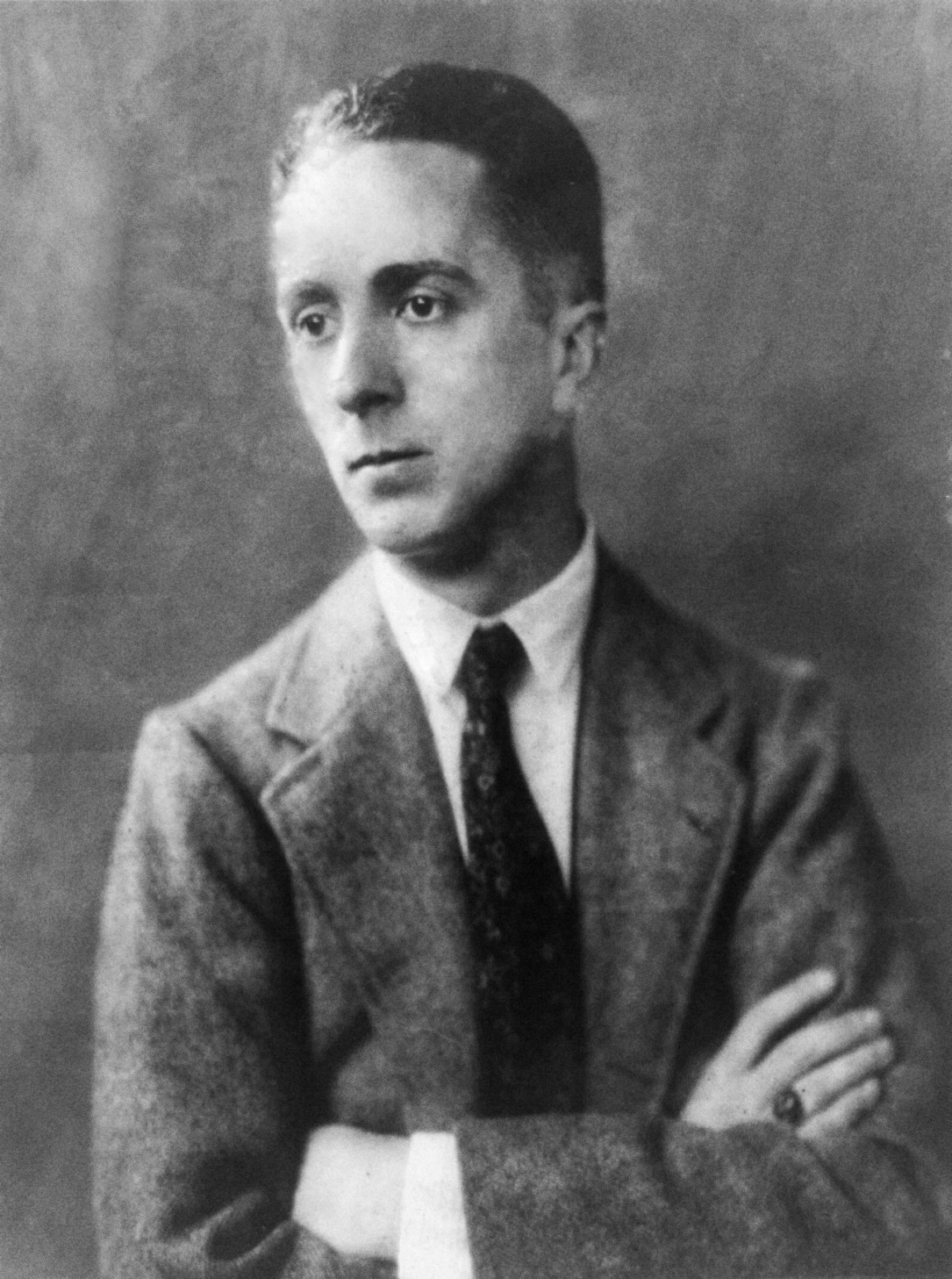
Norman Rockwell (1894–1978)

- Marjorie Acker (d. 1985), painter
- Stuart Davis (d. 1964), painter
- Ernest Fiene (d. 1965), lithographer, printmaker
- Otto Kuhler (d. 1977), painter
- Lucile Lloyd (d. 1941), muralist
- Bashka Paeff (d. 1979), sculptor
- Norman Rockwell (d. 1978), painter, illustrator
- Amanda Snyder (d. 1980), painter, printmaker
- James Thurber (d. 1961), cartoonist

=== 1895 ===
- Talbert Abrams (d. 1990), photographer
- Frederick Cornelius Alston (d. 1987), painter
- Peggy Bacon (d. 1987), printmaker, painter, illustrator
- Lucile Blanch (d. 1981), painter
- Adolf Dehn (d. 1968), lithographer, illustrator
- Buckminster Fuller (d. 1983), architect, visionary
- Harry Gottlieb (d. 1993), painter, illustrator
- Regina Olson Hughes (d. 1993), botanical illustrator
- Millie Rose Lalk (d. 1943), painter
- Dorothea Lange (d. 1965), photographer
- John Allen Wyeth (d. 1981), painter

=== 1896 ===
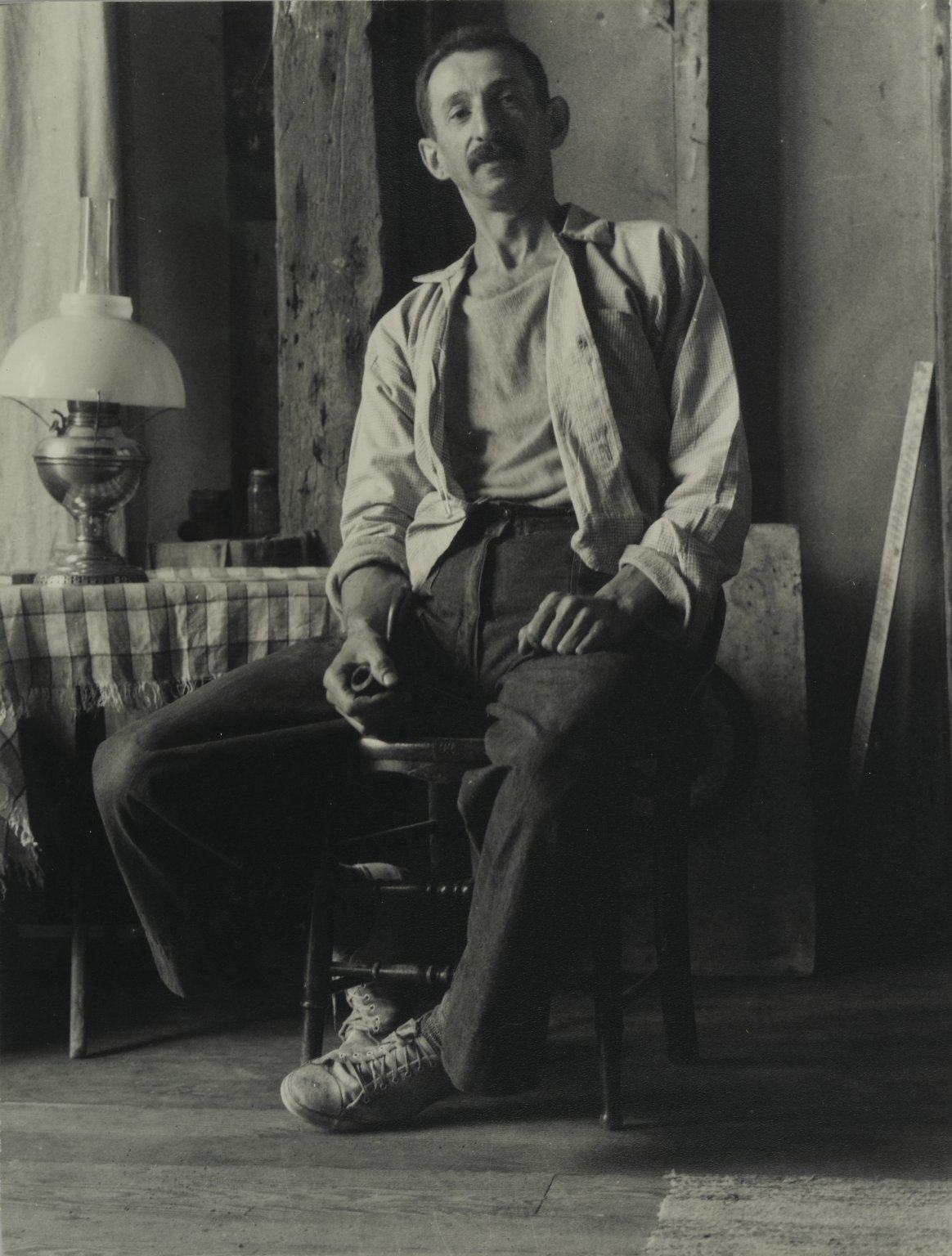
Morris Kantor (1896–1974)

- Arnold Blanch (d. 1968), painter, printmaker
- Allyn Cox (d. 1982), painter, muralist
- John Russell Fulton (d. 1979), painter, illustrator
- Morris Kantor (d. 1974), Belarusian-born painter
- Barbara Latham (d. 1989), painter, printmaker, illustrator
- Eve Ryder (d. 1984), painter
- Charmion von Wiegand (d. 1983), painter

=== 1897 ===
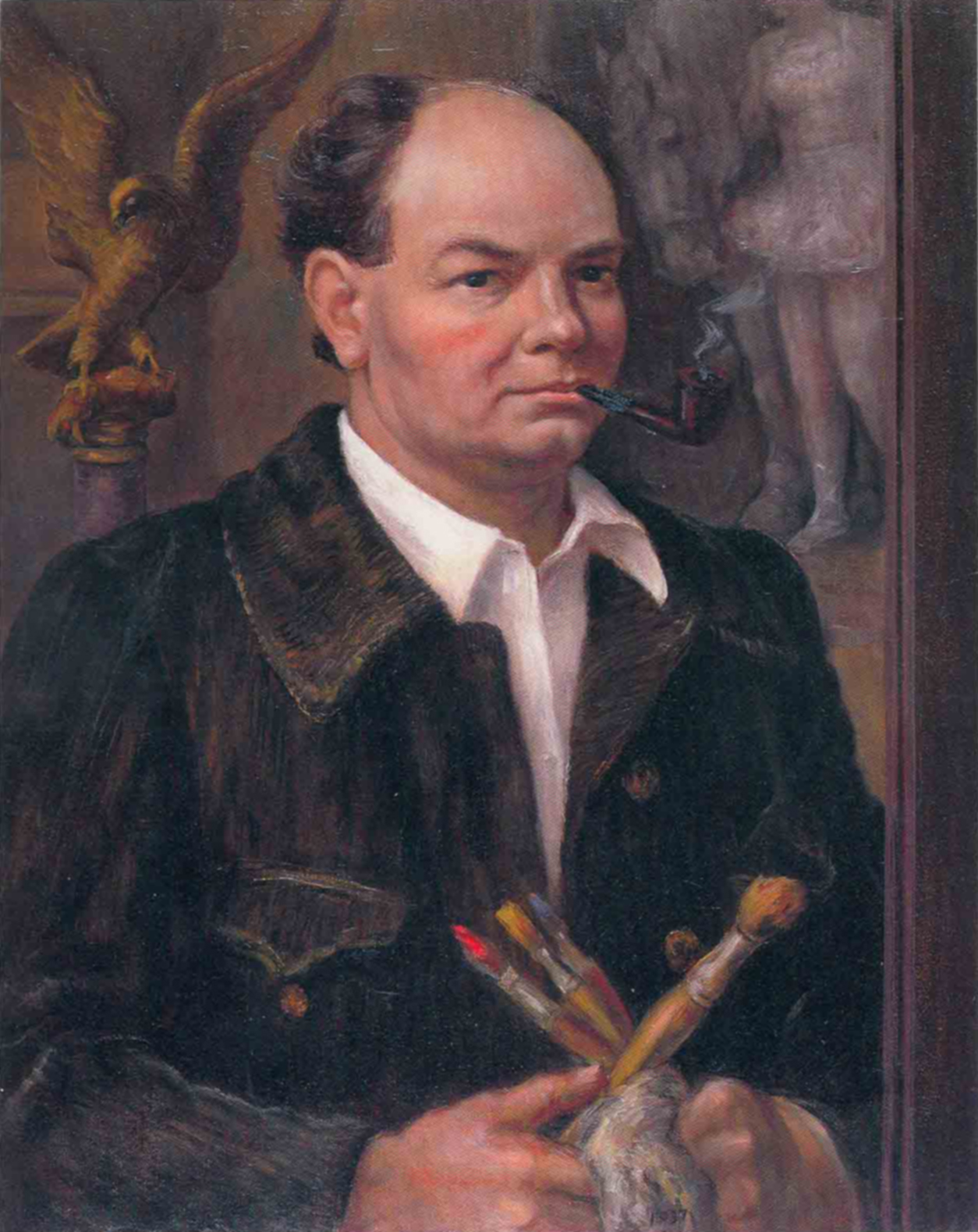
John Steuart Curry (1897–1946)

- Lawrence Louis Barrett (d. 1973), printmaker, educator
- James Billmyer (d. 1989), painter, illustrator
- Charles Ragland Bunnell (d. 1968), painter
- John Steuart Curry (d. 1946), painter, muralist, printmaker
- William Gropper (d. 1977), cartoonist, painter, muralist, printmaker
- Theodore Lukits (d. 1992), painter, muralist, illustrator, teacher
- Caroline Mytinger (d. 1980), painter
- Reuben Nakian (d. 1986), sculptor
- Dudley Pratt (d. 1975), sculptor
- Matthew E. Ziegler (d. 1981), painter, muralist

=== 1898 ===
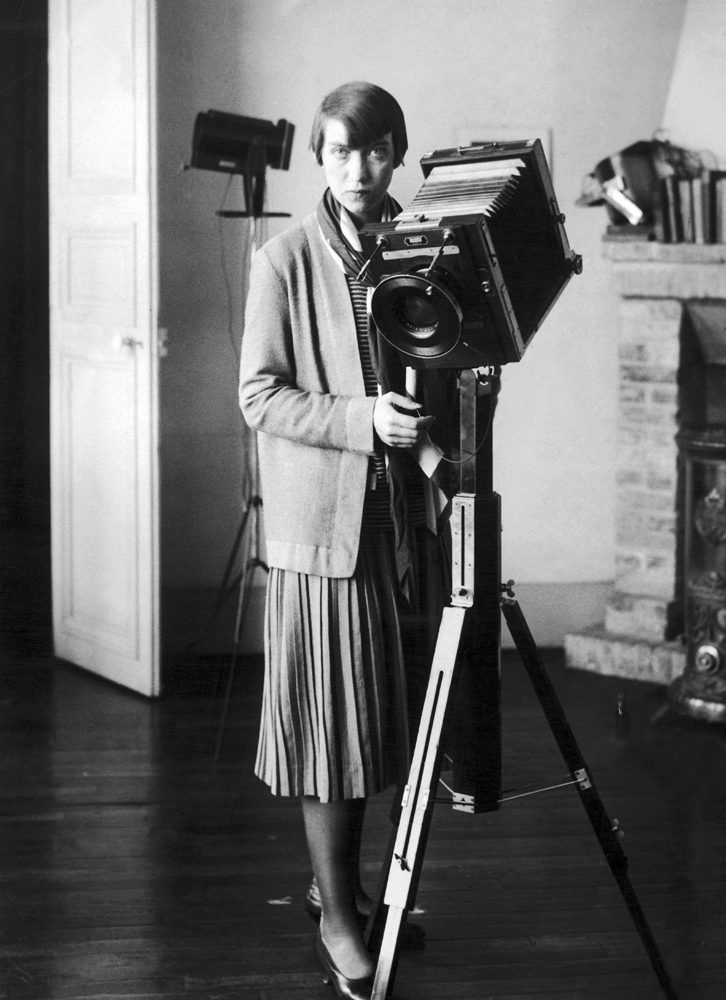
Berenice Abbott (1898–1991)

- Berenice Abbott (d. 1991), photographer
- Samuel Adler (d. 1979), artist
- Dewey Albinson (d. 1971), painter
- Robert Brackman (d. 1980), painter
- Alexander Calder (d. 1976), sculptor
- Aaron Douglas (d. 1979), painter
- Elsie Driggs (d. 1992), painter
- Lorser Feitelson (d. 1978), painter
- Hyman William Katz (d. 1988), painter, printmaker
- Reginald Marsh (d. 1954), painter, printmaker
- John McLaughlin (d. 1976), painter
- Kay Sage (d. 1963), painter
- Ben Shahn (d. 1969), painter, printmaker, graphic artist

=== 1899 ===
- Eugène Berman (d. 1972), painter
- Francis Chapin (d. 1965), painter
- Gladys Emerson Cook (d. 1976), painter, illustrator
- Channing Hare (d. 1976), painter
- De Hirsh Margules (d. 1965), painter
- Louise Nevelson (d. 1988), assemblage artist, sculptor
- Moses Soyer (d. 1974), painter
- Raphael Soyer (d. 1987), painter
- Bradley Walker Tomlin (d. 1955), painter

== See also ==
- American art
- Native American artists
- African American art
- Sculpture of the United States
- Feminist art movement
- Hudson River School
- Luminism
- American Impressionism
- Ashcan School
- Precisionism
- American scene painting
- Regionalism
- WPA Federal Art Project
- Northwest School
- Abstract expressionism
- Pop art
- Happenings
- Fluxus
- Intermedia
- Hard-edge painting
- Minimalism
- Post-painterly abstraction
- Color field painting
- Post-minimalism
- Process art
- Site-specific art
- Earth art
- Lyrical abstraction
- Photorealism
- Conceptual art
- Postmodernism
