= List of American women artists =

This is a list of women artists who were born in America or whose artworks are closely associated with that country. Included are recognized American women artists, known for creating artworks that are primarily visual in nature, in traditional media such as painting, sculpture, photography, printmaking, ceramics as well as in more recently developed genres, such as installation art, performance art, conceptual art, digital art and video art.

== A ==
- Luciana Abait (born 1971), muralist, digital photographer
- Mary Abbott (1921–2019), painter
- Berenice Abbott (1898–1991), photographer
- Gertrude Abercrombie (1909–1977), Surrealist painter
- Marjorie Acker (1894–1985), painter
- Pat Adams (born 1928), painter
- Lillian Adelman (1899 – 1985), printmaker
- Kathleen Gemberling Adkison (1917–2010), abstract expressionist painter
- Ellen Wetherald Ahrens (1859 – c. 1937), illustrator, miniature painter, stained glass artist
- Ariele Alasko, designer, woodworker
- Grace Albee (1890–1985), printmaker
- Maxine Albro (1903–1966), painter, muralist, lithographer, mosaic artist, sculptor
- Mabel Alvarez (1891–1985), painter
- Jean Goodwin Ames (1903–1986), muralist, educator
- Laurie Anderson (born 1947), performance artist, musician
- Eleanor Antin (born 1935), performance artist, installation art
- Janine Antoni (born 1964), sculptor, installation artist
- Ida Applebroog (born 1929), painter, sculptor
- Mia Araujo, painter
- Diane Arbus (1923–1971), photographer
- Julie Ault (born 1957), collaborative artist, curator
- Lynne Avadenka, printmaker, book artist
- Alice Aycock (born 1946), sculptor
- Helene Aylon, (1931–2020), painter

== B ==
- Carrie Ann Baade (born 1974), painter
- Alice Baber (1928–1982), painter
- Alexandra Backford (1942–2010), painter
- Lucy Bacon (1857–1932), painter
- Peggy Bacon (1895–1987), printmaker, painter, illustrator
- Gretchen Baer (born 1963), painter, performance artist
- Jo Baer (born 1929), painter
- Frances Bagley (born 1946), sculptor
- Margarete Bagshaw (1964–2015), painter, clay artist
- Jean Bales (1946–2004), painter, printmaker
- Rina Banerjee (born 1963), painter, sculptor
- Colette Bangert (born 1934), new media artist
- Hayley Barker (born 1973), painter
- Alice Pike Barney (1857–1931), painter
- Hannelore Baron (1926–1987), collage artist
- Jennifer Bartlett (born 1941), painter
- Mary Alice Barton (1917–2003), quilter
- Ruth Henshaw Bascom (1772–1848), folk art portraitist
- Isabel Bate (1909 – 1995), muralist
- Jean Cory Beall, (1909–1978), painter
- Betty Beaumont (born 1946), site-specific artist
- Cecilia Beaux (1855–1942), painter
- Aisha Tandiwe Bell, mixed media artist
- Caroline M. Bell (1874–1970), painter
- Emilie Benes Brzezinski (born 1932), sculptor
- Lynda Benglis (born 1941), sculptor
- Debra Bermingham (born 1953), interior scenes and still lifes
- Becca Bernstein (born 1977), painter
- Judith Bernstein (born 1942), feminist artist
- Helen Bershad (born 1934), abstract expressionist painter
- Linda Besemer (born 1957), abstract painter, video artist
- Rachel Bess (born c. 1979), painter
- Isabel Bishop (1902–1988), painter, printmaker
- Nell Blaine (1922–1996), painter
- Lucile Blanch (1895–1981), painter
- Erlena Chisolm Bland (1923–2009), painter
- Marie Bleck (1911–1949), printmaker
- Gertrude Bleiberg (1921–2001), painter
- Lucia Smith Carpenter Bliss (1823–1912), botanical artist
- Rebecca Bluestone (born 1953), tapestry artist
- Meghan Boody (born 1964), surrealist artist
- Margaret Boozer (born 1966), ceramist
- Nancy Borowick (born 1985), photographer
- Dorr Bothwell (1902–2000), painter, printmaker
- Margo Consuela Bors (born 1942), mural painter
- Pauline Boumphrey (1886–1959), sculptor
- Louise Bourgeois (1911–2010), sculptor, printmaker
- Margaret Bourke-White (1904–1971), photographer
- Sandra Bowden (born 1943), painter
- Katherine Bowling (born 1955), landscape artist
- Lisa Bradley (born 1951), painter
- Gladys Ames Brannigan (1882–1944), painter, muralist
- Dorothy Braudy, painter
- Sarah Brayer (born 1957), painter, paper artist, printmaker
- Cornelia Breitenbach (1948–1984), textile artist
- Karen Breschi (born 1941), ceramic artist
- Bessie Marsh Brewer (1884–1952), painter, printmaker
- Anna Richards Brewster (1870–1952), painter
- Allyn Bromley (born 1928), printmaker
- Leigh Brooklyn (born 1987), figurative artist
- Caroline Shawk Brooks (1840–1913), sculptor
- Romaine Brooks (1874–1970), painter
- Joan Brown (1938–1990), painter
- Laura Bruce (born 1959), artist
- Emilija Bucik Razman (1935–2024), painter and illustrator
- Fran Bull (born 1938), painter, printmaker, sculptor, installation artist
- Barbara Burrage (1900–1989), printmaker
- Edith Woodman Burroughs (1871–1916), sculptor
- Lilian Thomas Burwell (born 1927), painter, sculptor
- Mary Buskirk (1931–2009), fiber artist
- Deborah Butterfield (born 1949), sculptor
- Kathy Butterly (born 1963), sculptor
- Charlot Byj (1920–1983), greeting card artist
- Charlie Bynar, (born 1966), watercolor painter

== C ==
- Victoria Cabezas (born 1950), conceptual artist, photographer
- Nancy Calef, contemporary figure painter
- Sheila Cameron, contemporary graphic designer
- Floy Campbell (1873–1945), painter
- Pauline Campanelli (1943–2001), painter, writer
- Cristina Cardenas (born 1957), painter, printmaker
- Kate Carew (1869–1961), caricaturist
- Rhea Carmi (born 1942), abstract expressionist
- Mina Carney (1892-1974), Irish-American sculptor
- Virginia Cartwright (born 1943), ceramic artist
- Autumn Casey (born 1987), multimedia artist
- Mary Cassatt (1844–1926), painter, printmaker
- Eda Nemoede Casterton (1877–1969), painter
- Rosemarie Castoro (1939–2015), painter, sculptor
- Elizabeth Catlett (1915–2012), sculptor, printmaker
- Vija Celmins (born 1938), painter, graphic artist, printmaker
- Aleah Chapin (born 1986), portrait painter
- Sarah Charlesworth (1947–2013), conceptual artist, photographer
- Louisa Chase (1951–2016), painter
- Judy Chicago (born 1939), installation artist, sculptor
- Marie Z. Chino (1907–1982), potter, ceramic artist
- Chryssa (1933–2013), sculptor
- Anne Chu (1959–2016), sculptor
- Alson S. Clark (1876–1949), painter
- Grace Clements (1905–1969), muralist, mosaic artist
- Caroline Morgan Clowes (1838–1904), painter
- Cora Cohen (born 1943), painter
- Hannah Cohoon (1788–1864), painter
- Max Colby (born 1990), textiles, installation artist
- Bethany Collins (born 1984), book artist
- Ethel Blanchard Collver (1875–1955), impressionist painter
- Gladys Emerson Cook (1899–1976), painter, illustrator
- Austine Wood Comarow (1942–2020), light artist
- Alice Cooper (1875–1937), sculptor
- Annette Corcoran (born 1930), graphic artist, ceramist
- Sue Jean Covacevich (1905–1998), painter
- Susanne Crane (born 1966), painter
- Susan Crile (born 1942), painter
- Imogen Cunningham (1883–1976), photographer
- Marian Curtis (1882–1944), painter

== D ==
- Fra M. Dana (1874–1948), painter
- Jo Davidson (1883–1952), sculptor
- Eleanor Layfield Davis (1911–1985), painter, sculptor
- Helena Smith Dayton (1879–1960), painter, sculptor
- Rosetta DeBerardinis, contemporary painter
- Pat DeCaro (born 1951), painter
- Angel De Cora (1871–1919), painter, illustrator
- Mathilde De Cordoba (1882 – 1944), printmaker
- Elizabeth de Cuevas (1929–2023), French-born American
- Virginia Dehn (1922–2005), painter, printmaker
- Dorothy Dehner (1901–1994), sculptor, printmaker
- Perla de Leon (born 1952), photographer
- Jenny Eakin Delony (1866–1949), painter
- Elizabeth Demaray, sculptor
- Agnes Denes, (born 1931), conceptual artist
- Maya Deren (1917–1961), avant-garde filmmaker and theorist, photographer
- Mamie Deschillie (1920–2010), folk artist
- Lillian Desow-Fishbein (1921–2004), painter
- Heather Dewey-Hagborg (born 1982), information art, bio-hacker
- Lesley Dill (born 1950), multi-media artist
- Margaret Dillard, contemporary painter
- Francesca DiMattio (born 1981), painter, sculptor
- Edith Dimock (1876–1955), painter
- Eulabee Dix (1878–1961), miniatures painter
- Maria R. Dixon (?-1896), painter, illustrator
- Michele Oka Doner (born 1945), sculptor, printmaker, video artist
- Seena Donneson (1924–2020), sculptor
- Bailey Doogan (born 1941), painter
- Helen Thomas Dranga (1866–1940), painter
- Katherine S. Dreier (1877–1952), painter
- Rosalyn Drexler (1926–2025), painter
- Elsie Driggs (1898–1992), painter

== E ==
- Margaret Fernie Eaton (1871–?), book plate illustrator
- Abastenia St. Leger Eberle (1878–1942), sculptor
- Sheila Elias (born 1945), installation artist
- Mary Endico (born 1954), watercolor painter
- Nita Engle (1925–2019), painter
- Janeil Engelstad, contemporary artist, curator
- Marisol Escobar (1930–2016), sculptor, printmaker
- Inka Essenhigh (born 1969), painter
- Dulah Marie Evans (1875–1951), painter, illustrator, printmaker, photographer, etcher
- Lin Evola (born 1950), sculptor

== F ==
- Claire Falkenstein (1908–1997), sculptor
- Cornelia Adele Strong Fassett (1831–1898), portrait painter
- Sonya Fe (born 1952), painter
- Jo Feiler (born 1951), photographer
- Mildred Feinberg (1899–1990), painter
- Lauren Fensterstock (born 1975), installation artist, sculptor, goldsmith
- Lillian Prest Ferguson (1867–1955), Canadian-born painter
- Jackie Ferrara (born 1929), sculptor
- Rae Ferren (born 1929), impressionist painter
- Carole Feuerman (born 1945), sculptor
- Perle Fine (1905–1988), abstract painter
- Janet Fish (1938–2025), painter
- Alice Underwood Fitch (1862–1936) award-winning painter
- Audrey Flack (1931–2024), painter
- Hertha E. Flack (1916–2019), painter, philanthropist
- Lola Flash (born 1959), photographer
- Enid Foster (1895–1979), sculptor, performance artist
- Constance Edith Fowler (1907–1996), painter, printmaker
- Helen Frank (born 1930), painter, printmaker
- Jane Frank (1918–1986), painter
- Helen Frankenthaler (1928–2011), painter, printmaker
- Andrea Fraser (born 1965), performance artist
- Laura Gardin Fraser (1889–1966), sculptor
- Susie Frazier (born 1970), mixed media artist
- Helen C. Frederick (born 1945), printmaker
- Jane Freilicher (1924–2014), painter
- Edith Frohock (1917–1997), painter, printmaker
- Wilhelmina Weber Furlong (1878–1962), painter

== G ==
- Wanda Gág (1893–1946), printmaker, illustrator
- Ellen Gallagher (born 1965), painter, mixed media artist
- Jacalyn Lopez Garcia (born 1953), multimedia artist
- Elizabeth Jane Gardner (1837–1922), painter
- Sonia Gechtoff (1926–2018), painter
- Mary Gehr (1913–1997), painter, printmaker
- Nellie Huntington Gere (1868–1949), painter, illustrator
- Sybil Gibson (1908–1995), painter
- Ann Gillen, sculptor
- Ruth Gikow (1915–1982), muralist
- Helen Gilbert (1922–2002), painter, kinetic sculptor
- Charlotte Gilbertson (1922–2014), painter, printmaker
- Margaret Girvin Gillin (1833–1915), painter
- Jane Emmet de Glehn (1873–1961), painter
- Judith Godwin (1930–2021), painter
- Leah Golberstein, contemporary installation artist
- Margery E. Goldberg (born 1950), painter, sculptor
- Sarah Beth Goncarova (born 1980), painter, sculptor, installation artist
- Elizabeth Goodridge (1798–1882), miniatures painter
- Sarah Goodridge (1788–1853), miniatures painter
- Lori K. Gordon (born 1958), multi-media artist
- April Gornik (born 1953), painter
- Nancy Graves (1939–1995), sculptor, painter, printmaker
- Dorothy Grebenak (1913–1990), pop art, textile artist
- Elizabeth Shippen Green (1871–1954), illustrator
- Glenda Green (born 1945), painter
- Mary Sheppard Greene (1869–1958), painter, illustrator
- Molly Gregory (1914–2006), woodworker, furniture maker
- Lucila Villaseñor Grijalva, muralist
- Mimi Gross (born 1940), painter
- Jolán Gross-Bettelheim (1900–1972), printmaker
- Hilda Grossman Morris (1911–1991), sculptor
- MK Guth (born 1963), installation artist

== H ==
- Hildegarde Haas (1926–2002), painter
- Carol Haerer (1933–2002), painter
- Lauren Halsey (born 1987), installation artist
- Elaine Hamilton-O'Neal (1920–2010), painter
- Helen Hardin (1943–1984), painter
- Tracy Harris (born 1958), painter
- Jan Harrison (born 1944), painter, sculptor
- Rachel Harrison (born 1966), sculptor, photographer
- Grace Hartigan (1922–2008), painter
- Jann Haworth (born 1942), sculptor
- Ana Lisa Hedstrom (b. 1943), fiber artist
- Mary Heebner (born 1951), painter
- Mary Heilmann (1940–2026), painter, sculptor
- Carolyn Heller (1937–2011), painter, decorative artist
- Nestor Hernández (1961–2006), photographer
- Eva Hesse (1936–1970), sculptor
- Cornelia Ellis Hildebrandt (1876–1962), miniature painter
- Claude Raguet Hirst (1855–1942), trompe-l'œil painter, woodworker
- Beth Van Hoesen (1926–2010), printmaker
- Camille Hoffman (born 1987), installation artist
- Nancy Holt (1938–2014), sculptor, installation artist
- Jenny Holzer (born 1950), conceptual artist
- Edna Boies Hopkins (1872–1937), woodblock printer
- Violet Hopkins (born 1973), painter
- Naomi Louise Sunderland Hosterman (1903–1990), painter
- Letitia Huckaby (born 1972), photographer, mixed media
- Winnifred Hudson (1905–1996), abstract painter
- Anita Huffington (born 1934), sculptor
- Regina Olson Hughes (1895–1993), botanical illustrator
- Anna Hyatt Huntington (1876–1973), sculptor
- Luchita Hurtado (1920–2020), painter
- Alice Clary Earle Hyde (1876–1943), botanical artist

== J ==
- Wendy W. Jacob (born 1958), sculptor
- Lotte Jacobi (1896–1990), photographer
- Laura Ann Jacobs (born 1960), sculptor, mixed media artist
- Hazel Brill Jackson (1894–1991), sculptor, engraver, drawer
- Yvonne Jacquette (born 1934), painter, printmaker
- Shirley Jaffe (1923–2016), painter
- Terrell James (born 1955), painter, sculptor
- Elizabeth James-Perry (born 1973), scrimshawing
- Angela Jansen (born 1929), painter, sculptor
- Elizabeth Gilbert Jerome (1824–1910), painter
- Annette P. Jimerson (born 1966), painter
- Cathy Josefowitz (1956–2014), painter
- Joni T. Johnson (1934–1988), painter
- Martina Johnson-Allen (born 1947), painter, sculptor, and printmaker, educator
- Ida E. Jones, painter
- Joan Jonas (born 1936), video, performance artist, other media
- Lois Mailou Jones (1905–1998), painter
- Lorna Jordan (1954–2021), environmental artist
- Joanne Julian, contemporary mixed media artist

== K ==
- Florence Brevoort Kane (1895–1956), sculptor
- Beth Katleman (born 1959), sculptor
- Susan Kaprov (born 1946), multi-disciplinary artist
- Gertrude Käsebier (1852–1934), photographer
- Lila Katzen (1925–1998), sculptor
- Betty Keener Archuleta (1928–1998), painter
- Alice De Wolf Kellogg (1862–1900), painter
- Mary Kelly (born 1941), conceptual artist
- Greta Kempton (1901–1991), portrait painter
- Catherine Kernan (born 1948), painter
- Sandy Kessler Kaminski (born 1969), painter, mixed-media artist
- Harriet A. Ketcham (1846–1890), sculptor
- Ilah Marian Kibbey (1883–1957), genre and landscape painter
- Karen Kilimnik (born 1955), painter, installation artist
- Dorothy Stratton King (1909–2007), painter, printmaker
- Emma B. King (1857–1933), impressionist
- MaPo Kinnord (born 1960), ceramic artist, sculptor
- Sam Kirk (born 1981), street artist, muralist
- Mary Kirkwood (1904–1995), portrait painter, muralist
- Marilyn Kirsch (born 1950), painter
- Minnie Klavans (1915–1999), painter
- Fay Kleinman (1912–2012), painter
- Hedy Klineman, contemporary portrait painter
- Anna Elizabeth Klumpke (1856–1942), painter
- Gwendolyn Knight (1914–2005), painter
- Cynthia Knott (born 1952), seascape painter
- Alison Knowles (born 1933), Fluxus performance artist, printmaker
- Florence Koehler (1861–1944), designer, jeweler
- Ida Kohlmeyer (1912–1997), painter, sculptor
- Elaine de Kooning (1918–1989), painter
- Marni Kotak (born 1974), performance artist
- Margia Kramer (born 1939), mixed-media artist
- Lee Krasner (1908–1984), painter
- LaVerne Krause (1924–1987), printmaker, painter
- Barbara Kruger (born 1945), photographer, graphic artist, sculptor

== L ==
- Rachel Lachowicz (born 1964), painter
- Suzanne Lacy (born 1945), installations, video, performance artist
- Anna Coleman Ladd (1878–1939), sculptor
- Millie Rose Lalk (1895–1943), painter
- Rosy Lamb (born 1973), painter, sculptor
- Dorothea Lange (1895–1965), photographer
- Ellen Lanyon (1926–2013), painter
- Abigail Larson (fl 2010s), illustrator
- Marie-Thérèse Lasselle (1743–1819), embroiderer, watercolorist
- Barbara Latham (1896–1989), painter, printmaker, illustrator
- Louise Lawler (born 1947), photographer
- Nancy Lawton (1950–2007), silver point artist
- Mary Le Ravin (1905–1992), multimedia artist
- Doris Lee (1905–1983), painter
- Zoe Leonard (born 1961), photographer, visual artist
- Sherrie Levine (born 1947), conceptual artist
- Fran Lew (born 1946), painter
- Ann Lewis (born 1981)
- Edmonia Lewis (1845–1911), sculptor
- Marcia Lewis (artist) (born 1949), jewelry designer
- Maya Lin (born 1959), installation artist
- Pat Lipsky (born 1941), painter
- Llanakila, contemporary painter, digital artist
- Lucile Lloyd (1894–1941), muralist
- Judith Lodge (born 1941), painter, photographer
- Zoe Longfield (1924–2013), abstract expressionist artist
- Angela Lorenz (born 1965), book artist
- Helen Lundeberg (1908–1999), painter
- Genevieve Springston Lynch (1891–1960), painter

== M ==
- Cornelia MacIntyre Foley (1909–2010), painter
- Florence MacKubin (1857–1918), portrait painter
- Ethel Magafan (1916–1993), painter
- Claire Mahl Moore (1917–1988), printmaker
- Silvia Malagrino (born 1950), multimedia artist, filmmaker
- Maxine Martell (born 1937)
- Agnes Martin (1912–2004), painter
- Louise Martin (1911–1995), photographer
- Maria Martinez (1887–1980), potter, ceramist
- Soraida Martinez (born 1956), painter
- Emily Mason (1932–2019), painter
- Mercedes Matter (1913–2001), painter
- Amanda Matthews (born 1968), sculptor, painter, public art designer
- Louisa Matthíasdóttir (1917–2000), painter
- Randi Matushevitz (born 1965), painter
- Cornelia F. Maury (1866–1942), portrait painter
- Brookie Maxwell (1956–2015), artist, curator
- Jessie Hull Mayer (1910–2009), painter, muralist, printmaker
- Nell Brooker Mayhew (1875–1940), painter
- Paula McCartney (born 1971), photographic works
- Renee McGinnis (born 1962), painter
- Sarah McKenzie (born 1971), painter
- Leza McVey (1907–1984), ceramist
- Alexa Meade (born 1986), body artist
- Nellie Meadows (1915–2006), artist
- Donna Meistrich (born 1954), painter, sculptor, animator
- Dalila Paola Méndez (born 1975), painter
- Ana Mendieta (1948–1985), performance artist
- Nora Chapa Mendoza (born 1932), abstract painter
- Adah Isaacs Menken (1835–1868), actress, painter, poet
- Geneva Mercer (1889–1984), sculptor
- Betty Merken, painter, printmaker, abstract geometric monotypes
- Katherine Merrill (1876–1962), painter
- Deborah Mesa-Pelly (born 1968), painter
- Anne Michalov (1904–2001), printmaker
- Frances Myers, printmaker
- Eleanore Mikus (1927–2017), painter
- Anna Louisa Miller (1906–1997), painter
- Melissa Miller (born 1951), painter
- Joan Mitchell (1925–1992), painter, printmaker
- Edna Zyl Modie (1886–1981), painter
- Charlotte Moorman (1933–1991), Fluxus, performance artist
- Rebecca Jo Morales (born 1962), painter
- Dorothy Morang (1906–1994), painter
- Ree Morton (1933–1977), painter, sculptor
- Jill Moser (born 1956), painter
- Grandma Moses (1860–1961), painter
- Ruth Mountaingrove (1923–2016), photographer, poet
- Brenna Murphy (born 1986), psychedelic art
- Elizabeth Murray (1940–2007), painter, printmaker
- Grace H. Murray (1872–1944), watercolor painter
- Laura Myntti (born 1962), painter
- Caroline Mytinger (1897–1980), painter

== N ==
- Elva Nampeyo (1926–1985), potter, ceramic artist
- Fannie Nampeyo (1900–1987), potter, ceramic artist
- Iris Nampeyo (c. 1860–1942), potter, ceramic artist
- Inez Nathaniel-Walker (1911–1990), artist
- Alice Neel (1900–1984), painter
- Anne Neely (born 1946), painter
- Deborah Nehmad (born 1952), printmaker, mixed-media artist
- Pamela Nelson, contemporary painter, installation artist
- Hương Ngô (born 1979), installation artist, conceptual artist
- Abigail May Alcott Nieriker (1840–1879), artist
- Gladys Nilsson (born 1940), painter
- Ann Nooney (1900–1964), printmaker
- Tameka Norris (born 1979), performance artist
- Kenda North (born 1951), photographer

== O ==
- Violet Oakley (1874–1961), muralist
- Linda Obermoeller (1941–1990), portrait painter
- Noni Olabisi (1954–2022), painter and muralist
- Mina Fonda Ochtman (1862–1924), painter
- Georgia O'Keeffe (1887–1986), painter
- Rose O'Neill (1874–1944), comic strip artist
- Catherine Opie (born 1961), photographer
- Marianne Dwight Orvis (1816-1901), watercolor painter of Massachusetts
- Sono Osato (born 1960), artist

== P ==
- Linda Pace (1945–2007), contemporary, metal artists
- Josephine Paddock (1885–1964), painter
- Bashka Paeff (1894–1979), sculptor
- Susanna Paine (1792–1862), portrait painter
- Louise Parks (born 1945), painter
- Irene E. Parmelee (1847–1934), portrait painter
- Clara Weaver Parrish (1861–1925), painter, printmaker, stained glass designer
- Betty Parsons (1900–1982), painter, gallerist
- Eunice Parsons (1916–2024), modernist collagist
- Pat Passlof (1928–2011), painter
- Christina Patoski (born 1948), photographer, video artist
- Ruthe Katherine Pearlman (1913–2007), painter, art educator
- Leemour Pelli (born 1964). painter
- Agnes Lawrence Pelton (1881–1961), modernist painter
- Beverly Pepper (1924–2020), sculptor, painter
- Isabelle Clark Percy West (1882–1976), designer
- I. Rice Pereira (1902–1971), abstract painter
- Eve Peri (1897–1966), fiber artist
- Lilla Cabot Perry (1848–1933), painter
- Elizabeth Peyton (born 1965), painter
- Nan Phelps (1904–1990), painter
- Mary Pillsbury Weston (1817–1895), painter
- Eunice Pinney (1770–1849), watercolor painter
- Adrian Piper (born 1948), conceptual artist
- Vanessa Platacis (born 1973), painter and installation artist
- Alethea Hill Platt (1860–1932), painter
- Gloria Plevin (born 1934), painter
- Stephanie Pogue (1944–2002), printmaker
- Susan Mohl Powers (born 1944), sculptor, painter
- Alex Prager (born 1979), photographer, filmmaker
- Astrid Preston (born 1945), painter
- Mary Elizabeth Price (1877–1965), painter
- DeAnn L. Prosia (born 1963), printmaker
- Ali Prosch (born 1979), sculptor, visual artist and performance artist
- Ann Purcell (born 1941), painter

== Q ==
- Dextra Quotskuyva (born 1928), potter, ceramic artist

== R ==
- Raquel Rabinovich (born 1929), painter, sculptor
- Yvonne Rainer (born 1934), performance artist, choreographer, dancer
- Hilla von Rebay (1890–1967), painter
- Sophy Regensburg (1885–1974), naïve painter
- Josephine L. Reichmann (1864–1938), painter
- Deborah Remington (1930–2010), painter, printmaker
- Sue Reno, fiber artist
- Christie Repasy (born 1958), floral painter
- Robin Richmond (fl. 1980), painter
- Jessie Beard Rickly (1895–1975), painter
- Linda Ridgway (born 1947), sculptor
- Judy Rifka (born 1945), painter, video artist
- Erin M. Riley (born 1985), weaver, tapestry artist
- Faith Ringgold (born 1930), painter, fabric artist
- Anne Louise Gregory Ritter (1868–1929), painter, ceramicist
- Deborah Roberts (born 1962), painter
- Adelaide Alsop Robineau (1865–1929), painter, potter
- Dorothea Rockburne (born 1932), painter
- Anita Rodriguez (born 1941), painter
- Julia Rommel (born 1980), abstract painter
- Stephanie Rond (born 1973), painter
- Louise Emerson Ronnebeck (1901–1980), painter
- Christine Rosamond (1947–1994), painter
- Esther Rose (1901–1990), painter, calligrapher
- Martha Rosler (born 1943), video, photo-text, installation, performance art
- Barbara Rossi (born 1940), painter
- Susan Rothenberg (1945–2020), painter, printmaker
- Suze Rotolo (1943–2011), book artist, illustrator
- Brie Ruais (born 1982), multi-media artist
- Meridel Rubenstein (born 1948), photographer, installation artist
- Katie Ruiz (born 1984), painter
- Rosa Rush (1905 – 1971), printmaker

== S ==
- Alison Saar (born 1956), sculptor, installation artist
- Betye Saar (1926–2026), assemblage artist
- Betty Sabo (1928–2016), landscape painter, sculptor
- Kay Sage (1898–1963), painter
- Claudia Peña Salinas (1975-), mixed media artist
- Anna M. Sands (1860–1927/1940), painter
- Augusta Savage (1892–1962), sculptor
- Anne Savedge, contemporary photographer
- Joanna E. Schanz, basket weaver
- Kerri Scharlin, painter and conceptual artist
- Lonny Schiff (born 1929), collage artist
- Rachel Schmeidler, multi-media artist
- Carolee Schneemann (1939–2019), performance artist
- Joan Schulze (born 1936), textile artist
- Donna N. Schuster (1883–1953), painter
- Ethel Schwabacher (1903–1984), painter
- Barbara Schwartz (1949–2006), painter, sculptor
- Lillian Schwartz (born 1927), digital artist
- Marilyn Scott-Waters (born 1958), children’s book illustrator
- Janet Scudder (1869–1940), sculptor
- Bernarda Bryson Shahn (1903–2004), painter, lithographer
- Ann Leda Shapiro (born 1946), painter
- Honoré Desmond Sharrer (1920–2009), painter
- Susan Louise Shatter (1943–2011), landscape painter
- Ruth Faison Shaw (1888–1969), painter
- Judith Shea (born 1948), sculptor
- Mary Michael Shelley (born 1950), carver, painter
- Kara Shepherd (born 1911), surrealist painter
- Cindy Sherman (born 1954), photographer
- Sandra Sider (born 1946), quilt artist, curator
- Lauren Silva (born 1987), painter
- Laurie Simmons (born 1949), photographer
- Lorna Simpson (born 1960), photographer
- Schandra Singh (born 1977), painter
- Catherine Eaton Skinner (born 1968), multimedia artist
- Clara Skinner (1902–1976), print maker, woodcuts
- Sylvia Sleigh (1916–2010), painter
- Jaune Quick-To-See Smith (born 1940), painter, printmaker
- Jessie Willcox Smith (1863–1935), illustrator
- Kiki Smith (born 1954), sculptor, printmaker, multi-media
- Amanda Snyder (1894–1980), painter, printmaker
- Joan Snyder (born 1940), painter
- Judith Solodkin (born 1945), printmaker
- Malia Solomon (1915–2005), textile artist
- Kathleen Mary Spagnolo (1919–2016), painter
- Elizabeth Sparhawk-Jones (1885–1968), painter
- Meredyth Sparks (born 1972), multimedia artist
- Nancy Spero (1926–2009), painter, printmaker, collage artist
- Betty Spindler (born 1943), ceramist
- Laura Splan (born 1973), multimedia artist
- Molly Springfield (born 1977), drawer
- Sharon Sprung (fl 2000s), visual artist
- Linda St. Clair (born 1952), wildlife painter
- Wendy Red Star (born 1981), multimedia artist
- Anita Steckel (1930–2012), graphic artist
- Marsha Steinberg (born 1946), painter, etcher
- Monika Steiner (born 1972), sculptor
- Bettina Steinke (1913–1999), painter, muralist
- Pat Steir (born 1938), painter
- Hedda Sterne (1910–2011), painter
- Florine Stettheimer (1871–1944), painter, set designer
- Beulah Stevenson (1890–1965), painter
- Lizbeth Stewart (1948–2013), ceramist
- Elena Stonaker (born 1985), textile artist
- Georgianna Stout (born 1967), graphic designer
- Renee Stout (born 1958), sculptor
- Marjorie Strider (1931–2014), sculptor
- Jane Stuart (1812–1888), portrait painter
- Michelle Stuart (born 1933), painter, sculptor, photographer
- Dorothy Sturm (1910–1988), illustrator, metal smith
- Altoon Sultan (born 1948), painter
- Carol Sutton (1945–2025), painter
- Liza Sylvestre, visual artist

== T ==
- Anne Tabachnick (1927–1995), painter
- Dorothea Tanning (1910–2012), painter, surrealist
- Fay Morgan Taylor (1909–1990), modernist artist
- Bernadette Thompson (born 1969), nail artist
- Juliet Thompson (1873–1956), painter
- Hannah Tompkins (1920–1995), painter, printmaker
- Selina Trieff (1934–2015), abstract artist
- Virginia True (1900–1989), painter
- Anne Truitt (1921–2004), sculptor
- Wu Tsang (born 1982), filmmaker, performance artist
- Diane Tuckman (born 1939), silk painter
- Mym Tuma (born 1940), painter, mixed media
- Ruth Tunstall Grant (1945–2017), painter
- Lynne Woods Turner (born 1951), abstract painter
- Vadis Turner (born 1977), mixed media, textile artist
- MJ Tyson (born 1986), jewelry designer

== U ==
- Ruth Pershing Uhler (1895–1967), painter, curator
- Mierle Laderman Ukeles (born 1939), installation artist
- Doris Ulmann (1882–1934), photographer
- Audrey Ushenko (born 1945), figurative painter

== V ==
- Aramenta Dianthe Vail (1820–1888), miniatures painter
- Clover Vail (born 1939), print-maker
- Jessie Rose Vala (born 1977), installation artist
- Lesley Vance (born 1977), painter
- Bessie Potter Vonnoh (1872–1955), sculptor

== W ==
- Marion Wachtel (1875–1951), painter
- Stacy Lynn Waddell (born 1966), painter
- Carol Wald (1935–2000), illustrator
- Kara Walker (born 1969), painter, printmaker, installation artist
- Kay WalkingStick (born 1935), painter
- Barbara Walch (born 1950), ceramist
- Mildred Waltrip (1911–2004), illustrator
- Nina B. Ward (1885–1944), painter
- Nina de Creeft Ward (1933), sculptor
- Mary Parks Washington (1924–2019), painter
- Adele Watson (1873–1947), painter and lithographer
- Lynda Watson (born 1940), metalsmith
- Carol Wax (born 1953), printmaker
- Andrea Way (born 1949), painter, sculptor
- Stacey Lee Webber (born 1982), metalsmith
- Mary Hortense Webster (1881–1965), sculptor
- Carrie Mae Weems (born 1953), photographer
- Susan Weil (born 1930), painter
- Clara Barck Welles (1869–1965), silversmith
- Jean Wells (born 1949), mosaic sculptor
- Bessie Wheeler (born 1876), painter
- Candace Wheeler (1827–1923), interior and textile designer
- Karen Wheeler (born 1955), painter
- Lindsey White (born 1980), multi-media artist
- Emmi Whitehorse (born 1957), painter
- Elizabeth Whiteley (born 1945), multi-media artist
- Gertrude Vanderbilt Whitney (1875–1942), sculptor
- Charmion Von Wiegand (1896–1983), painter
- Harriet "Hattie" Elizabeth Wilcox (1869–1943), ceramics artist
- Hannah Wilke (1940–1993), multi-media artist
- Mary Rogers Williams (1857–1907), painter
- Edwina Florence Wills (1915–2002), sculptor
- Cordelia Wilson (1873–1953), painter
- Jane Wilson (1924–2015), painter
- Mary Ann Wilson (fl. 1810–1825), watercolor painter
- Jacqueline Winsor (born 1941), sculptor
- Leona Wood (1921–2008), painter
- Thelma Wood (1901–1970), silverpoint artist
- Francesca Woodman (1958–1981), photographer
- Anna Woodward (1868–1935), painter
- Amy Namowitz Worthen (born 1946), printmaker, engraver
- Antonia Wright (artist) (born 1979), multi-media artist
- Patience Wright (1725–1786), sculptor
- Henriette Wyeth (1907–1997), painter

== Y ==
- Enid Yandell (1870–1934), sculptor
- Mary Agnes Yerkes (1886–1989), painter
- Daisy Youngblood (born 1945), ceramic artist, sculptor
- Judy Youngblood (born 1948), painter
- Gertrude Ann Youse (died 1994), painter, teacher, and gallery director
- Marlene Tseng Yu (born 1937), abstract painter
- Lisa Yuskavage (born 1962), painter

== Z ==
- Dorian Zachai (1932–2015), fiber artist
- Connie Zehr (born 1938), installation artist
- Bhakti Ziek (born 1946), textile artist
- Andrea Zittel (born 1965), sculptor, installation artist
- Marguerite Zorach (1887–1968), painter, textile artist
