= Waltrip =

Waltrip is a surname. Notable people with the surname include:

- Brian Waltrip, soccer player
- Buffy Waltrip, wife of Michael
- Darrell Waltrip, NASCAR race car driver and brother of Michael
- Jason Waltrip, comic book creator and member of the Waltrip brothers
- John Waltrip, comic book creator and member of the Waltrip brothers
- Michael Waltrip, NASCAR race car driver and brother of Darrell
- Mildred Waltrip (1911–2004), American artist and illustrator

== See also ==
- Waltrip High School
- Darrell Waltrip Motorsports
- Michael Waltrip Racing
- Waltrip brothers
