= Josephine L. Reichmann =

American artist

- Born: 1864; Louisville, Kentucky
- Died: 1938 (aged 73–74); Chicago, Illinois
- Known for: Painting
- Spouse: Frank J. Reichmann

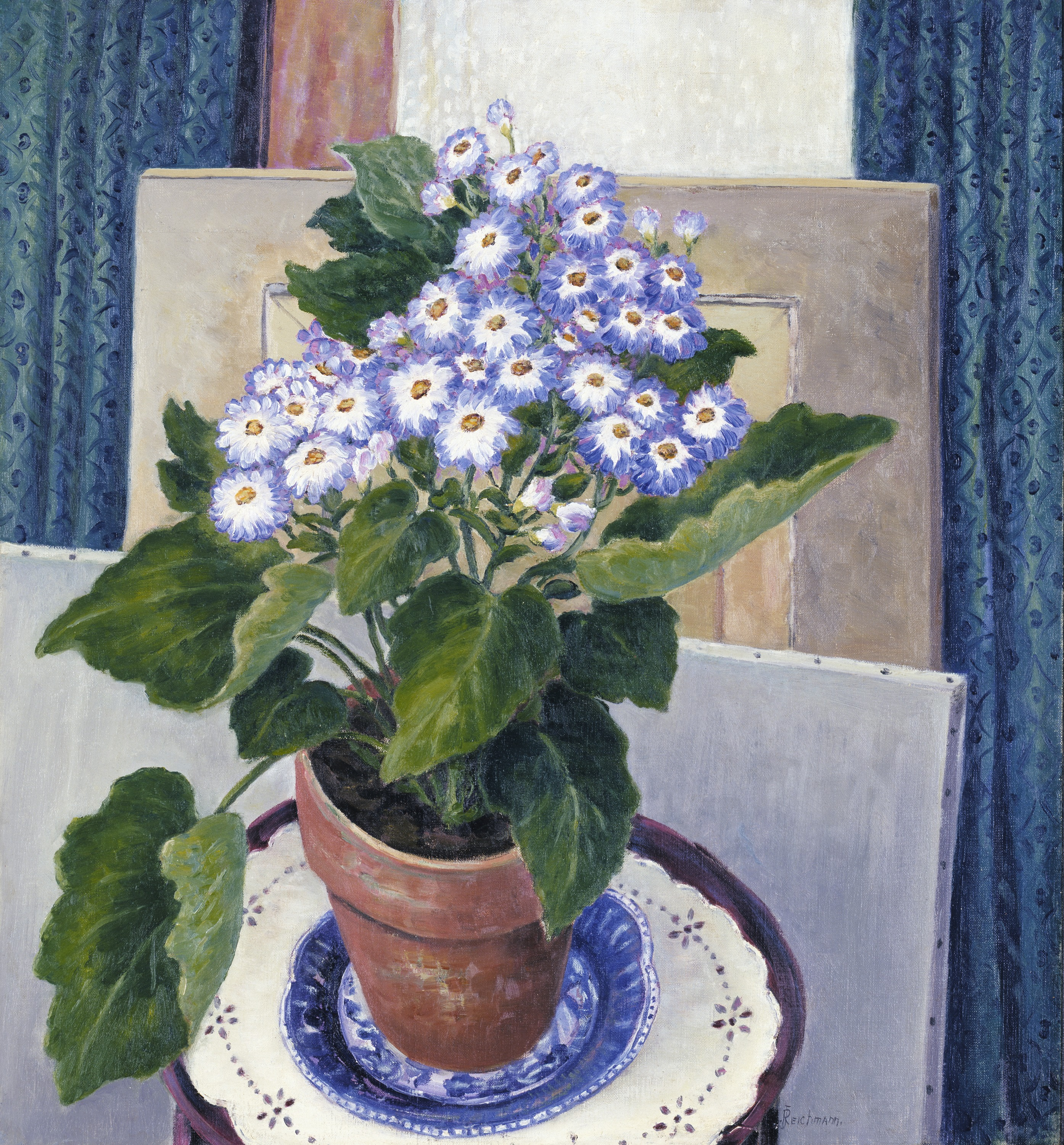
Cineraria

Josephine Lemos Reichmann (1864–1938) was an American painter.

== Biography ==
Reichmann was born in 1864 in Louisville, Kentucky. She studied at the School of the Art Institute of Chicago and continued her studies at the Summer School of the Art Students League of New York. She was a member of the Arts Club of Chicago, the American Watercolor Society, and the Chicago Society of Artists as well as the South Side Art association, and the Chicago Galleries association.

She was married to Frank J. Reichmann. She died in 1938 in Chicago. Her work is in the collection of the Smithsonian American Art Museum.
