= Linda Obermoeller =

- Born: March 4, 1941; St. Louis, Missouri
- Died: January 1, 1990; Houston, TX
- Known for: painter

Linda Obermoeller (March 4, 1941 - January 1, 1990) was an American artist known for her watercolor portrait paintings. During her career she worked with watercolor and pencil. She died at the age of 48. At the time of her death was displaying her work at the Harris Gallery in Houston, Texas and she had a painting displayed at the Watercolor USA Honor Society Watercolor Now II, a national juried exhibition, in which her watercolor, “Still Life with Trout”, won first place posthumously (1990).

Her work has been displayed at the University of Phoenix, Austin campus.

== Work ==
1974

- Award of Excellence "Three Fifty" Festival of Missouri Women in the Arts;
- Award of Merit "More Wheels" Festival of Missouri Women in the Arts;
- 4th professional graphics "Three Fifty" Missouri State Fair, Sedalia, Mo;
- 2nd Mixed Media "Ruth's Chair" GreenTree Festival, Kirkwood Mo;
- 2nd Prints, Drawings, Mixed Media "Schwinn" Carillon Art Walk, Clayton, Mo;
- 3rd Prints, Drawings, Misc. "Its Sunday Afternoon" Main St Art Fair, St Charles, Mo
