= Judy Youngblood =

American artist (born 1948)

- Born: 1948 (age 77–78); El Paso, Texas
- Education: University of Wisconsin–Madison
- Known for: painting

Judy Youngblood (born 1948) is an American artist. Youngblood is known for her paintings based on weather phenomena, and also for her mixed media art including paintings, drawings, etchings, and relief prints. She attended the University of Wisconsin–Madison and was associated with the Atelier 17 in Paris. Youngblood taught both printmaking and book arts at the University of North Texas in Denton. Youngblood was a MacDowell Fellow in 1982 and again in 1985, and her work has been included in over three hundred invitational and juried group exhibits. Youngblood has had two solo shows at William Campbell Contemporary Art in Fort Worth including "Changing Weather" in 2014 and "Unsettled Conditions" in 2019. Also in 2019, the Forum Gallery at Brookhaven College (Dallas) hosted a retrospective of her work: Judy Youngblood: The Effects of Time and Weather.

== Collections ==
Youngblood's work is included in the collections of the Smithsonian American Art Museum, the Brooklyn Museum and the Dallas Museum of Art.
