= Cornelia Breitenbach =

American textile artist (1948–1984)

- Born: July 28, 1948; Munich, Germany
- Died: October 27, 1984 (aged 36); Beverly Hills, California

Cornelia Breitenbach (July 28, 1948 – October 27, 1984) was an American textile artist.

== Early life ==
Breitenbach emigrated to the United States with her family in 1957 and grew up in Bethesda, MD. She studied at the Philadelphia College of Art, earning a bachelor of fine arts degree with honors in printmaking in 1970. In 1974, she received a master of fine arts degree in textile design from the Cranbrook Academy of Art in Bloomfield Hills, Michigan.

== Career ==
Breitenbach was appointed an assistant professor of art at the University of California, Los Angeles in 1980. In 1984, she took her own life in Beverly Hills, California.

Her work is included in the collections of the Smithsonian American Art Museum and the National Gallery of Art, Washington.
