= Marcia Lewis (artist) =

American jewelry designer (born 1946)

- Born: 1946 (age 79–80); Washington, DC
- Occupations: Jewelry designer and metalsmith

Marcia Lewis (born 1946 in Washington, DC) is an American jewelry designer and metalsmith. She attended San Diego State University and Long Beach State University. Her work was featured in the January 1987 issue of Ornament magazine. She is the author of the book Chasing: Ancient metalworking technique with modern applications] published in 1994. She is professor emeritus at Long Beach State University.

Her work is in the collection of the Carnegie Museum of Art and the Smithsonian American Art Museum. Her work was included in the 2021 exhibition The Process of Becoming: The Jewelry Collection of Carolyn L.E. Benesh at the Wayne Art Center.
