= Mathilde De Cordoba =

American artist

- Born: 1871 or 1875; New York City
- Died: 1942; Valhalla, New York
- Known for: Etching, Painting

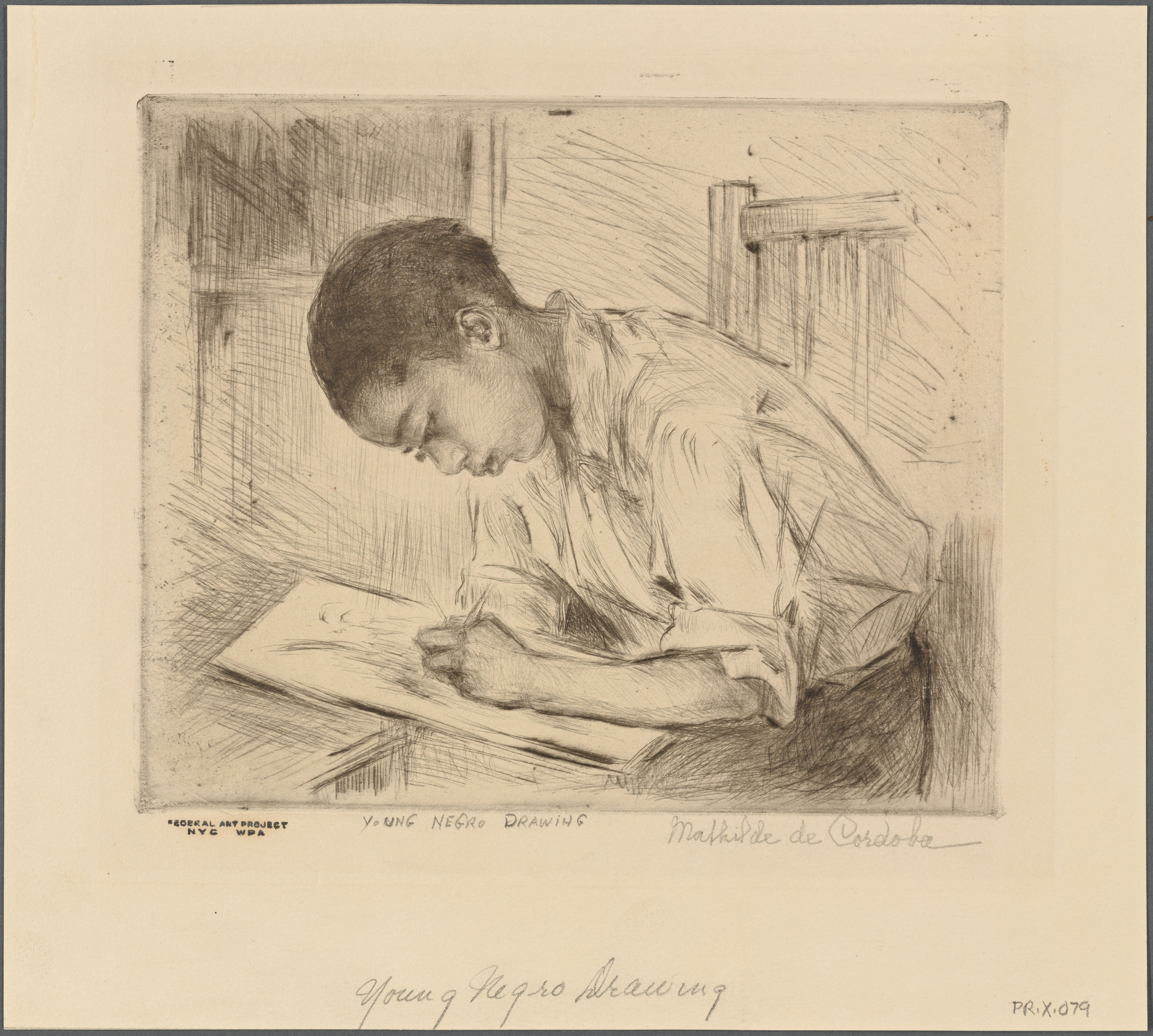
Young Negro Drawing c. 1935 - 1943

Mathilde De Cordoba (1871 or 1875 – 1942) was an American painter and printmaker known for her child portraits. De Cordoba produced prints for the Works Progress Administration (WPA). Her work is in the collection of the Metropolitan Museum of Art, the National Gallery of Art, and the Print Collection of The New York Public Library.
