= Katherine Merrill =

American artist

- Born: 1876; Milwaukee, Wisconsin
- Died: 1962 (aged 85–86)

Katherine Merrill (1876–1962) was an American artist. Her work is included in the collections of the Smithsonian American Art Museum, the Fine Arts Museums of San Francisco and the Art Institute of Chicago.
