= Laura Splan =

American Artist

Laura Splan (born 1973) is an American visual artist. She is based in New York City.

== Work ==
Splan's work explores the correlation between art, science technology and the traditional and experimental crafts. A primary influence is microbiological and medical imaging. She has created innovative works in lace referencing viruses and microbes. The lace Doilies are embroidered in radial virus patterns that visualize the HIV, SARS, Influenza and other virus structures. Splan has created watercolors using her own blood as a medium rather than paint. Splan uses the foil of familiar domestic artifacts and decorative textiles to convey meaning about the visceral body, biohazards and epidemics. Because her work often addresses pathogens and disease it has been described as beautiful and horrible. Splan describes her artistic goals are to inspire "beauty and horror, comfort and discomfort.

== Exhibitions ==
Her work has been shown at the Museum of Arts and Design in New York City.
