= Aramenta Dianthe Vail =

American painter

- Born: 1820
- Died: 1888 (aged 67–68)
- Known for: Miniature paintings

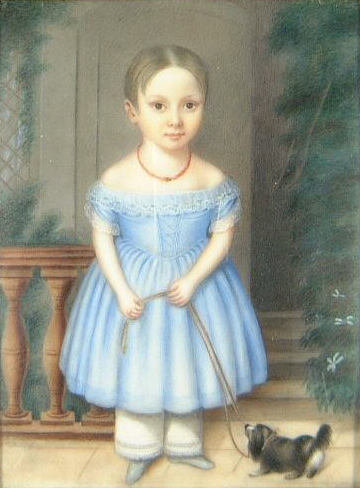
Mary R. Whitlock, 1843, watercolor on ivory, in the collection of the Metropolitan Museum of Art

Aramenta Dianthe Vail (1820–1888) was an American painter of miniatures.

== Work ==
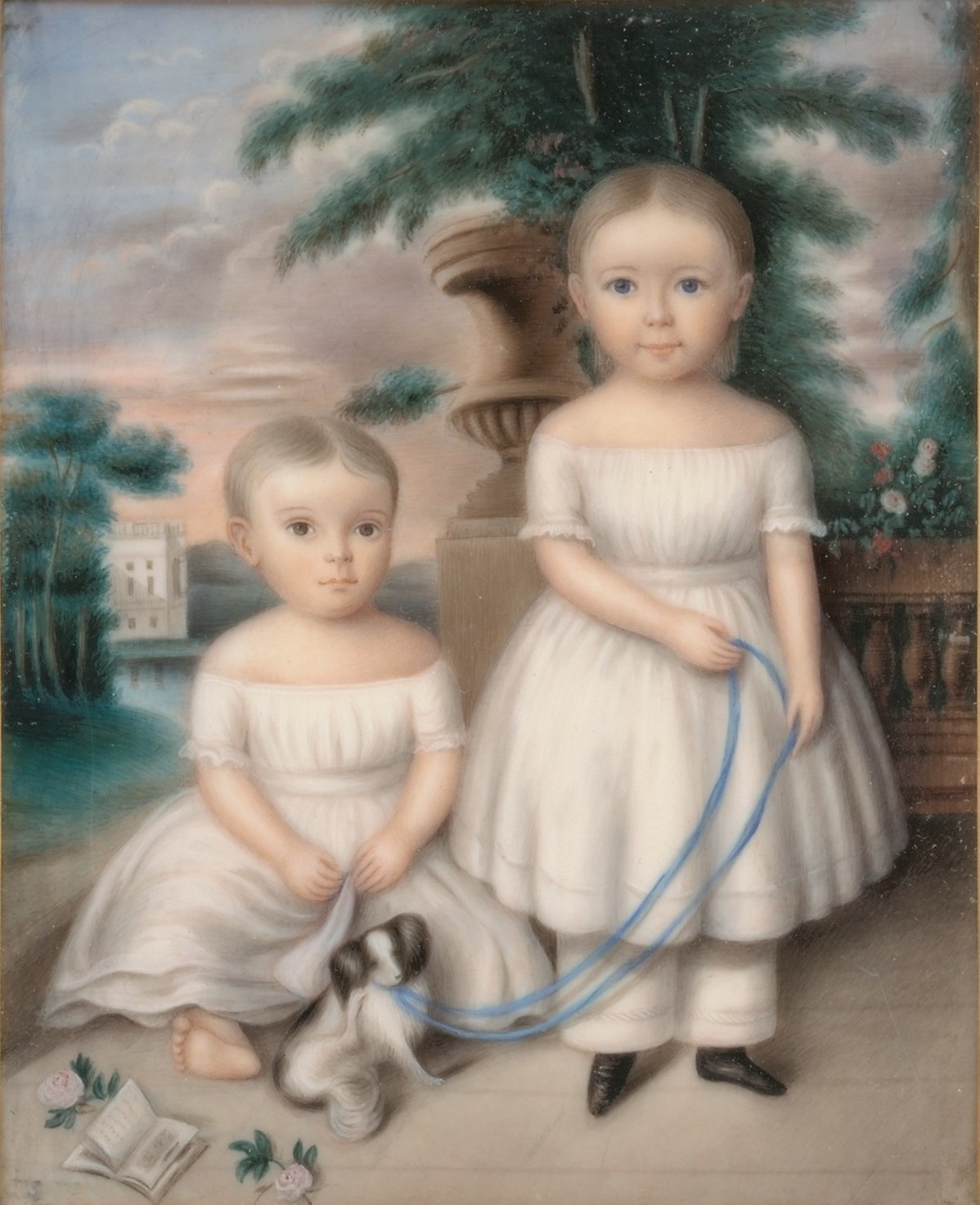
Watson Van Benthuysen II and Thomas Van Benthuysen, c. 1837, watercolor on ivory, in the collection of the Metropolitan Museum of Art

Vail lived in Newark, New Jersey from 1837 until 1838, and in New York City from 1839 until 1863. City directories list her as a "miniature painter" until 1858, and as a "seller of fancy goods" thereafter until 1863. She exhibited work at the National Academy of Design in 1838, 1841, and 1847; the Apollo Association in 1839; the American Institute in 1845; and the Brooklyn Art Institute in 1863. She appears never to have married, and in the census records from 1860 to 1880 is noted as living either alone or with members of her extended family.

Two portraits by Vail, both of children, are currently in the collection of the Metropolitan Museum of Art. A pair of portraits, once thought to be of the artist and her son, belong to the Cincinnati Art Museum. Portrait of a Woman dates to approximately 1840, and includes typical black garments of the time with a delicate lace collar, pinned by a brooch with its own miniature painting. Portrait of a Young Man dates to the same time frame. Another portrait, dated to 1840, is owned by the Yale University Art Gallery. Few of Vail's works have been published; her style has been described as "idiosyncratic" and her figures "unusually constructed", and she favored a matte finish on her pieces, unlike other painters of her generation.
