= Ann Nooney =

American printmaker

Ann Nooney (1893 or 1900 – 1964 or 1975) was an American printmaker. She was a participant in the 1930s Federal Works program (WPA), in and around New York City. Her work is included in the collections of the Smithsonian American Art Museum, the Ackland Art Museum of the University of North Carolina, the Metropolitan Museum of Art, and the Art Institute of Chicago.

== Gallery ==
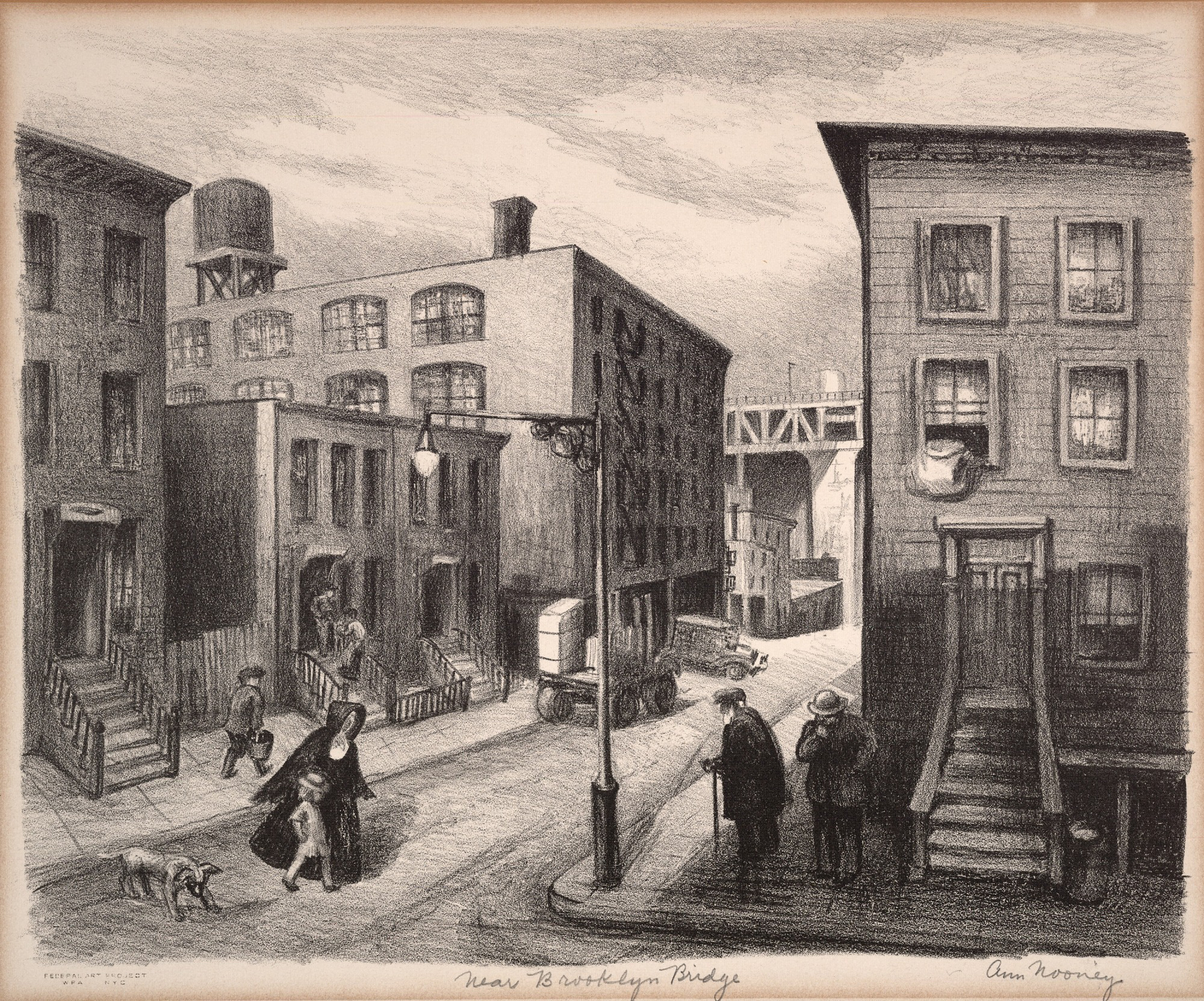
Near Brooklyn Bridge, 1935-1941

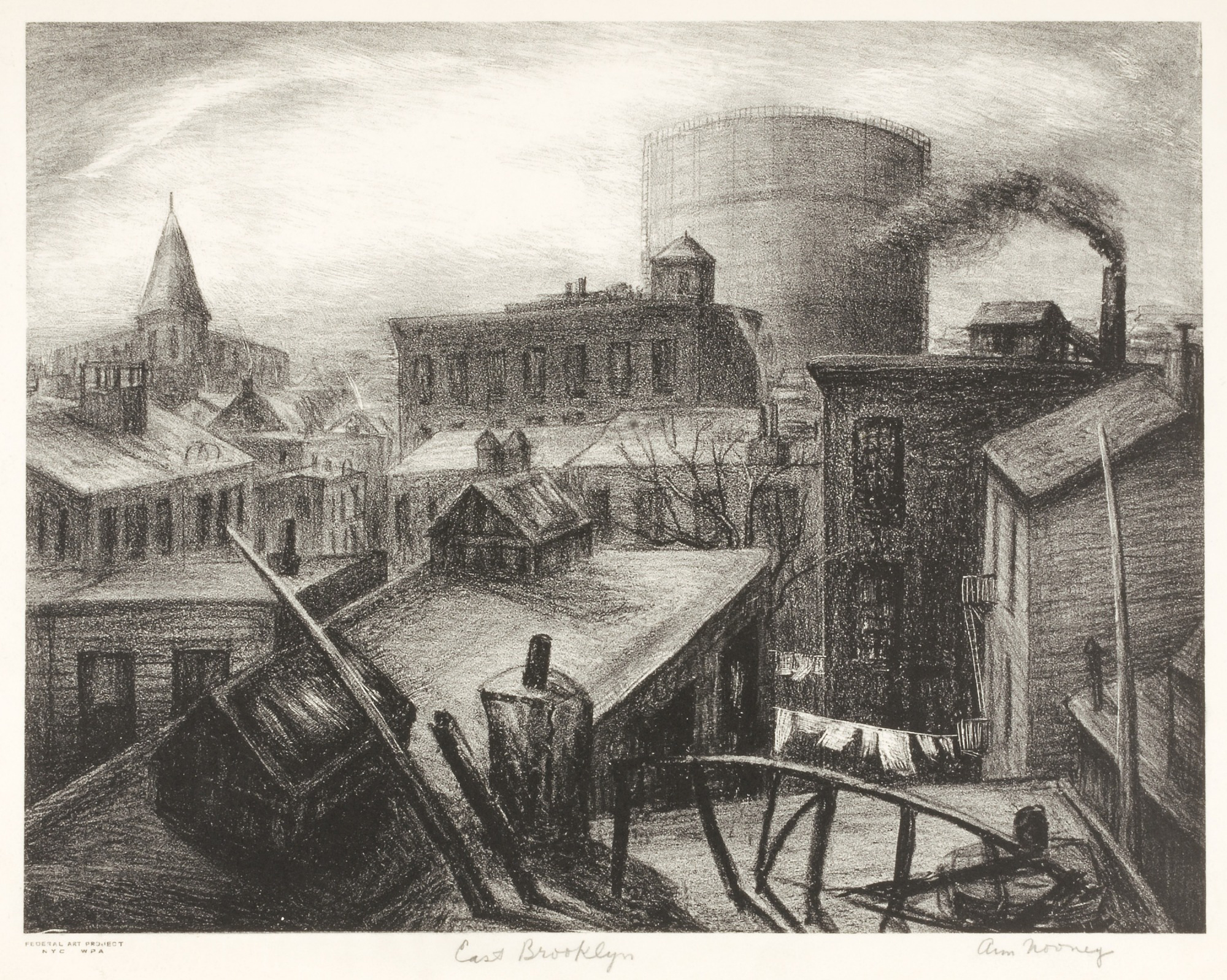
East Brooklyn, ca. 1935-1943
