= Paula McCartney =

American photographer

- Born: 1971 (age 53–54); Pittsburgh, PA
- Known for: photography

Paula McCartney (born 1971) is an American artist known for her photographic works.

She holds a BFA degree from Empire State College, New York (1998), and an MFA degree from the San Francisco Art Institute (2002).

Her work is included in the collections of the Smithsonian American Art Museum, the Cleveland Museum of Art, the Walker Art Center and the Museum of Contemporary Photography.
