= Rebecca Jo Morales =

American painter

Roadrunner by Rebecca Morales, 1996, Honolulu Museum of Art

Rebecca Jo Morales (born 1962) is an American artist born in Torrance, California. She studied at the California Institute of the Arts (Valencia, CA), Parsons The New School for Design (New York City), and earned a BFA from the Otis College of Art and Design (Los Angeles) in 1985. She worked as a field biology illustrator and as a paper conservator. She lives and works in Los Angeles.

== Art and career ==
"Morales's drawings are of botanical subjects – plants, grasses, lichens, mosses, molds, fungi, sometimes with flower-like spores sprouting – surmounting fragmented images of long twisted braids of air or strange knitted objects," wrote Gary Garrels in the exhibition catalogue: Fifteen LA Artists; Hammer Museum, Los Angeles, 2007. He continues, "The botanical subjects are field sames and photographs from the forests of California, the Pacific Northwest, Vermont and Maine." Other materials are found and collected by the artist.

"There's also an odd, photographic quality to Morales' mesmerizing works, which combine watercolor gouache, pastel and ink in ways that make light look liquid, sensuous, stirring. Think mid-19th century daguerreotypes, which seem to capture the souls of sitters via science and its newfangled technologies." Pagel, David, Los Angeles Times, February 11, 2009.

== Selected public collections ==
The Hammer Museum (Los Angeles), the Honolulu Museum of Art, and the Otis College of Art and Design (Los Angeles) are among the public collections holding works by Rebecca Morales.

Roadrunner (1996), in the collection of the Honolulu Museum of Art, is painted in gouache and watercolor on vellum. It illustrates the artist's almost photographic painting technique as well as her sculptural use of velum. Morales' non-objective paintings can be best described as "fantastically crafted abstractions that get your imagination going in so many directions that you start to wonder why they are neither maddening nor frustrating but strangely serene in their own offbeat sensitive way."
