= Christina Patoski =

American photographer, journalist, video artist

- Born: 1948 (age 76–77)

Christina Patoski (born 1948) is an American photographer, journalist and video artist. Patoski is known for her long-running project of photographing the holiday and religious displays in the yards of suburban American homes.

Her work is included in the collection of the Museum of Fine Arts Houston and the National Museum of American History.

== Books ==
- Merry Christmas America: A Front Yard View of the Holidays 1994.
