= Erlena Chisolm Bland =

American painter (1923-2009)

- Born: January 18, 1923; Washington, D.C.
- Died: February 16, 2009 (aged 86)
- Education: Howard University; University of Maryland, College Park
- Occupations: Painter and sculptor

Erlena Chisolm Bland (January 18, 1923 – February 16, 2009) was an American painter and sculptor.

Born in Washington, D.C., Bland attended Dunbar High School and earned her Bachelor of Fine Arts degree from Howard University; she received a master's degree in library science at the University of Maryland, College Park. She spent nearly two decades as a librarian working with special education students at Goding Elementary School in Washington. She created art during her free time, and in retirement took classes at the Maryland Institute College of Art, the Corcoran School of Art, and the Art League in Alexandria, Virginia before acquiring a studio. She exhibited throughout the Washington D.C. area and further afield during her career, showing work both solo and in group exhibitions. With her husband, Dr. Charles N. Bland, she had two children, a son and a daughter; the couple designed and built their own home on Kalmia Road in Washington. Bland died of cancer at a nursing home in Washington. She was buried at Fort Lincoln Cemetery after a funeral at the Dumbarton Chapel on the Howard University campus.
