= Rosa Rush =

American artist

- Born: Rosalie Rush; 1905
- Died: 1971 (aged 65–66)
- Known for: Printmaker

Rosa Rush (1905 – 1971) was an American artist known for her work with the Federal Art Project of the Works Progress Administration (WPA). Her work is included in the collections of the Metropolitan Museum of Art, the National Gallery of Art, and the Smithsonian American Art Museum.

== Gallery ==
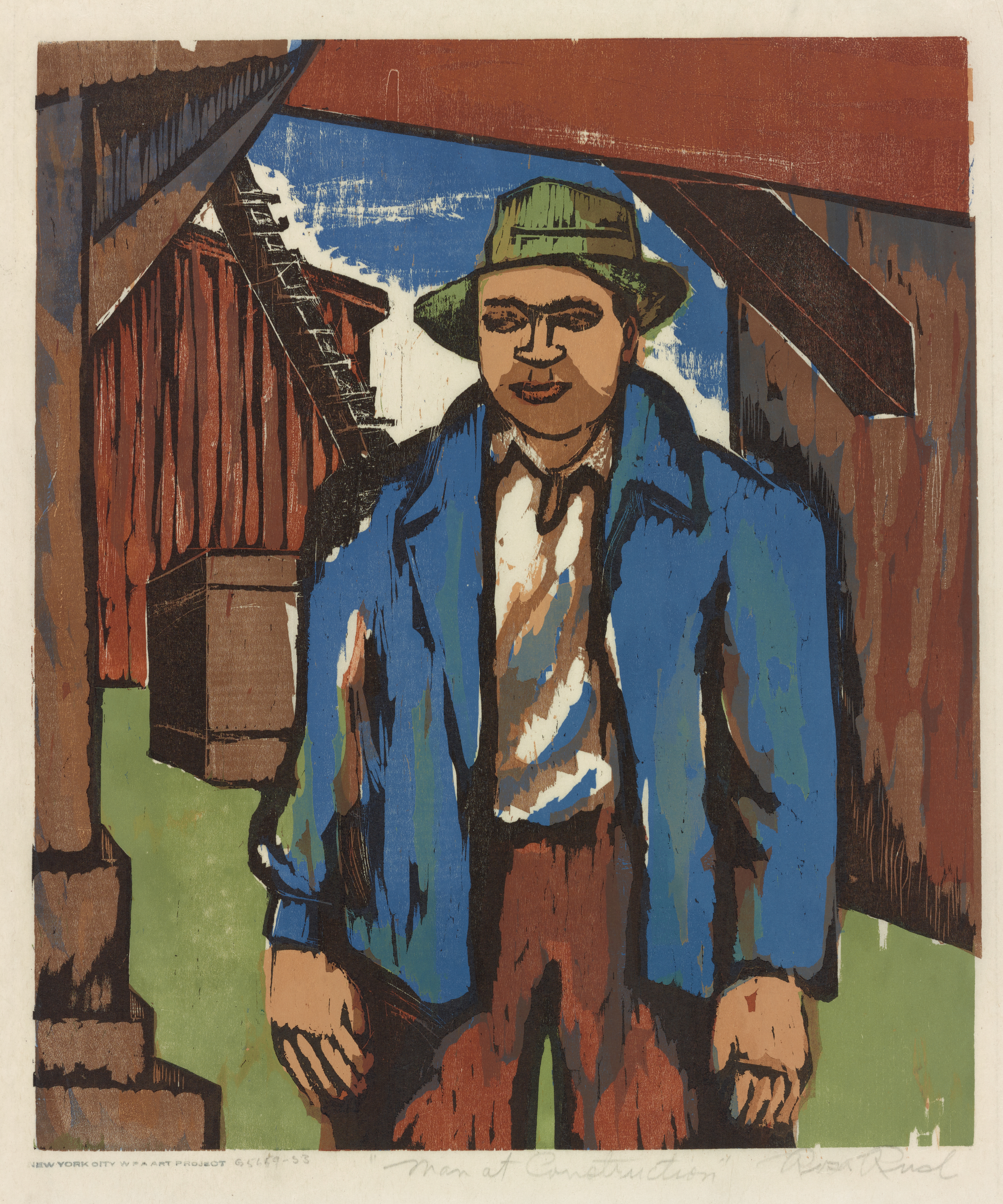
Man at Construction c. 1935 - 1943

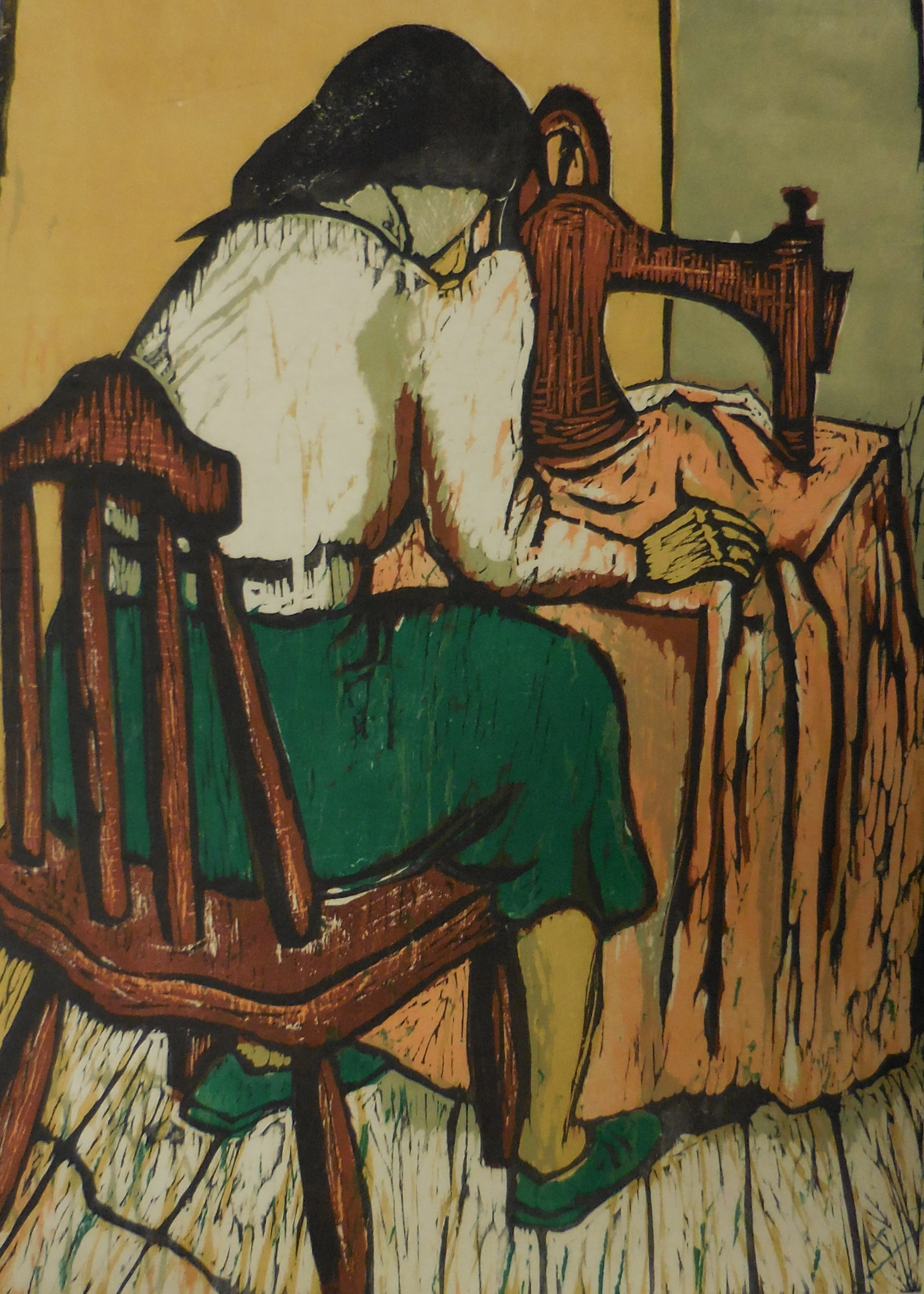
Seamstress c. 1936-42

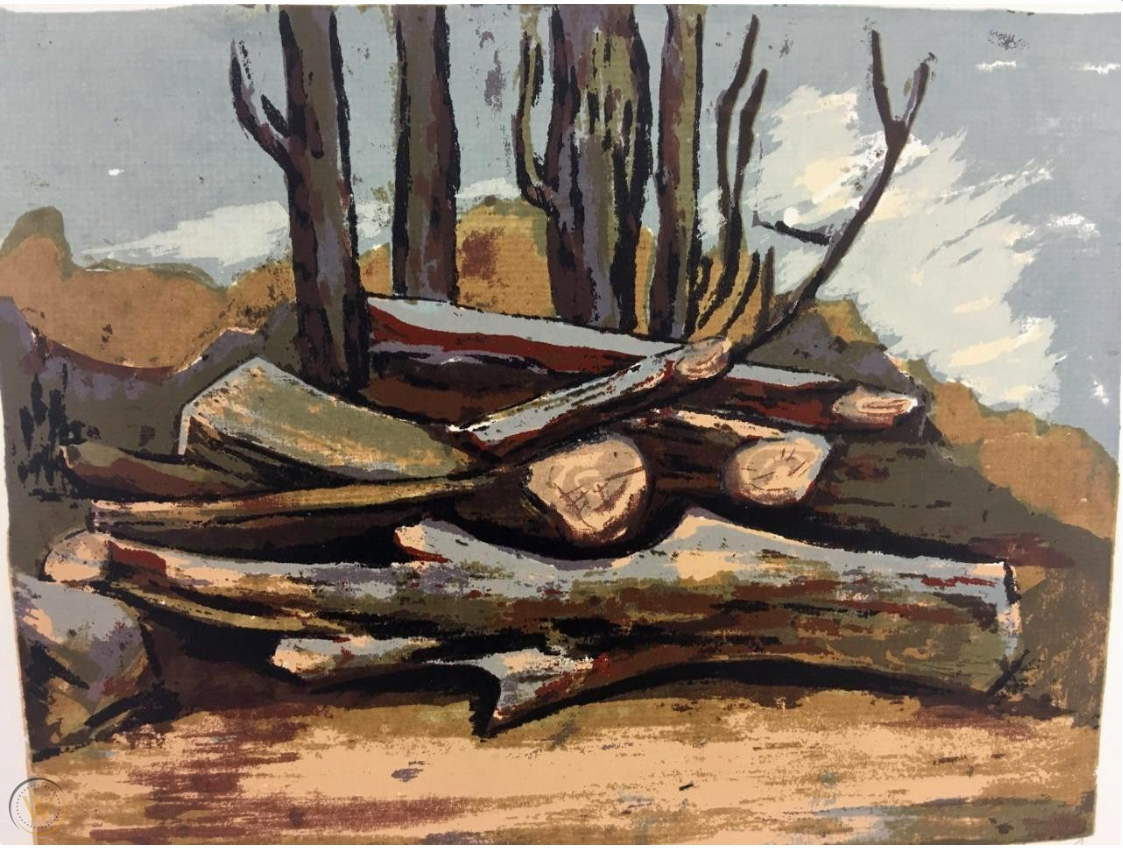
Tree Trunks c. 1935 - 1943
