= Naomi Louise Sunderland Hosterman =

American artist

Naomi Louise Sunderland Hosterman (1903–1990), also known as Naomi S. Hosterman, was an American painter and illustrator from Charleston, West Virginia.

== Biography ==
Naomi Louise Suderland Hosterman was born in Elkhart, Indiana in 1903. She moved to Charleston, West Virginia in the 1930s. Her paintings have been acquired by museums in Charleston and Huntington, West Virginia, and her illustrations appear in several books featuring the early history of the state of Virginia (later West Virginia). She was described in the 1940s as West Virginia's "ranking still-life and flower-composition artist". Hosterman died in 1990 in Los Alamitos, California.

== Notable works ==
Hosterman's paintings in public collections include:

- Marion College, Erma Byrd Art Gallery, University of Charleston
- Portrait of Governor Daniel D. T. Farnsworth, West Virginia State Museum
- Portrait of Governor William M. O. Dawson, West Virginia State Museum

Her illustrations appear in the following books:

- Greenbrier Pioneer and their Homes (1942)
- Pioneers and their Homes on Upper Kanawha (1942)
- Lewisburg Landmarks (1957)
- Floral Still-Life by Window
