= Anna M. Sands =

American painter

- Born: 1860; Maryland
- Died: 1927 (aged 66–67); Washington, D.C.
- Occupation: Painter, artist
- Parent(s): Benjamin F. Sands; Henrietta Maria French Sands

Anna M. Sands (born February 1860) was an American painter. Born in Maryland, she spent most of her career in Washington, D.C., beginning in 1891. She was an alumna of the Art Students League of Washington, and may have been among the artists associated with Alice Pike Barney and her circle. Sands served on the Board of Control of the Art League as well. She died sometime between 1927 and 1940. Sands was active as a pastellist for over thirty years in Washington, but very little is known about her life or career.
