= Lillian Adelman =

American artist

- Born: 1899
- Died: 1985 (aged 85–86)
- Known for: Printmaker

Lillian Adelman (1899 – 1985) was an American artist known for her work with the Federal Art Project of the Works Progress Administration (WPA). Her work is included in the collections of the Metropolitan Museum of Art, the Museum of Modern Art, the National Gallery of Art, the Philadelphia Museum of Art, and the Yale University Art Gallery.

== Gallery ==
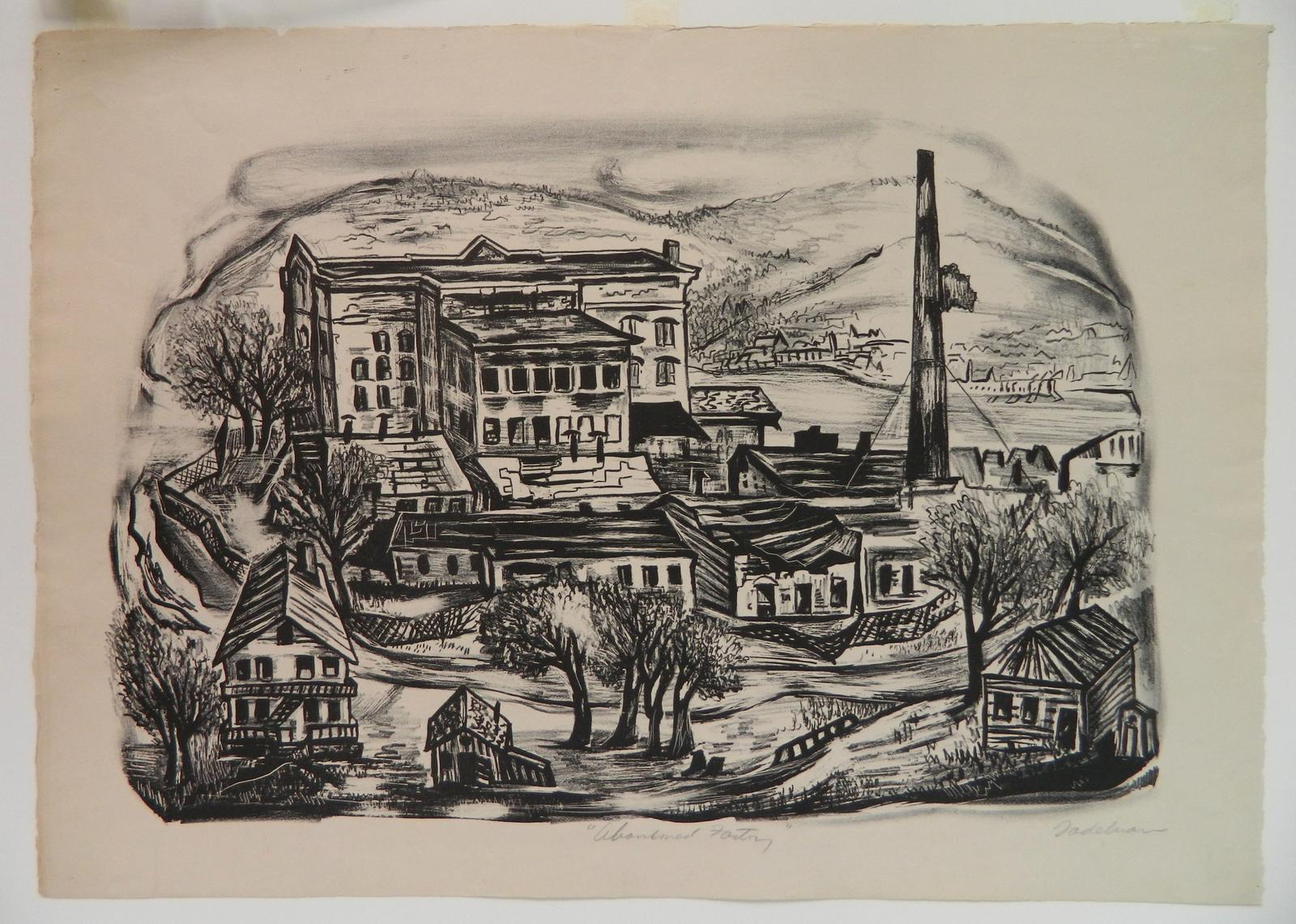
Abandoned Factory, c. 1936-42

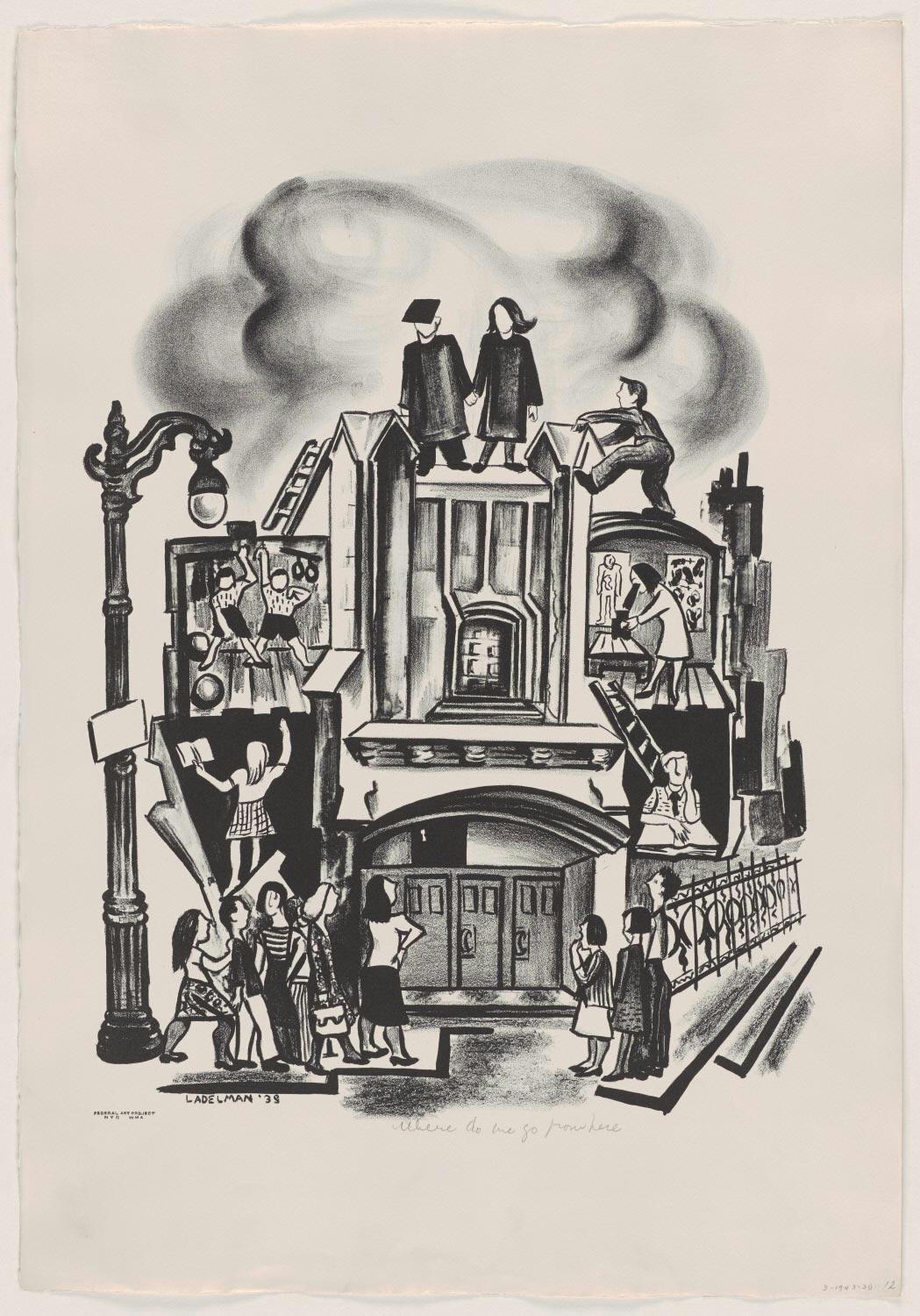
Where Do We Go from Here?, 1939

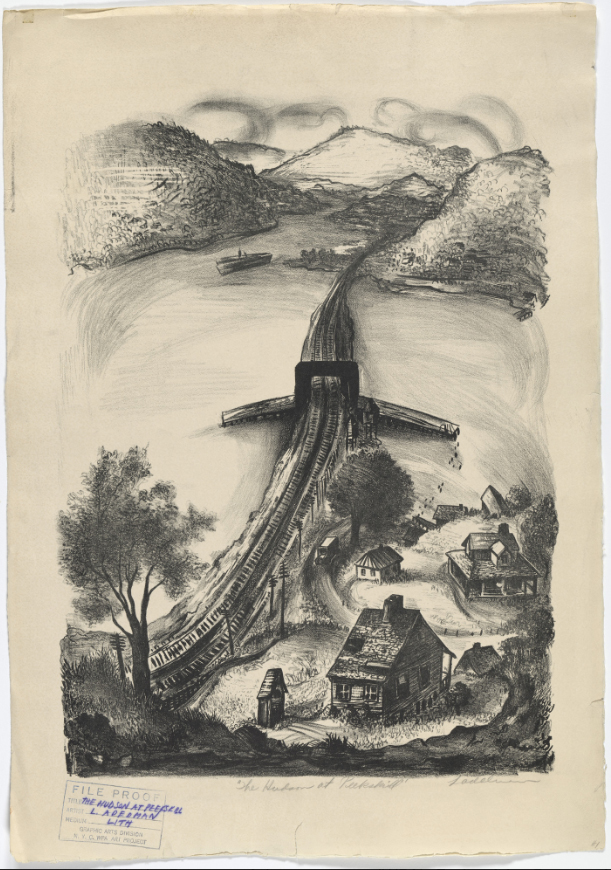
The Hudson at Peekskill, c. 1935–43
