= Ann Leda Shapiro =

American artist

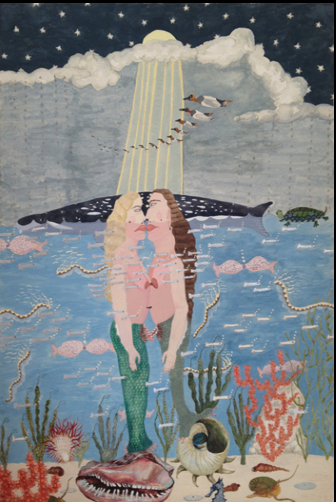
Two Sides of Self, Watercolor on Paper, 20"x14" (1971)

Ann Leda Shapiro (born 1946) is an American artist, raised in New York City. next door to the American Museum of Natural History and across the park from the Metropolitan Museum of Art.

She attended the San Francisco Art Institute (BFA,1969) and the University of California, Davis (MFA,1971). Shapiro's work was shown in a 1973 solo exhibition at the Whitney Museum of American Art. The Whitney censored several paintings, Two Sides of Self (1971) -- two hermaphroditic mermaids and Woman Landing on Man in the Moon or One Needs a Cock to Get By (1971). The work challenged ideas of gender non-conforming bodies and questioned the division between maleness and femaleness, pointing toward a unity that surfaces throughout her work. Forty years later the Seattle Art Museum acquired the two formally censored paintings for their permanent collection.

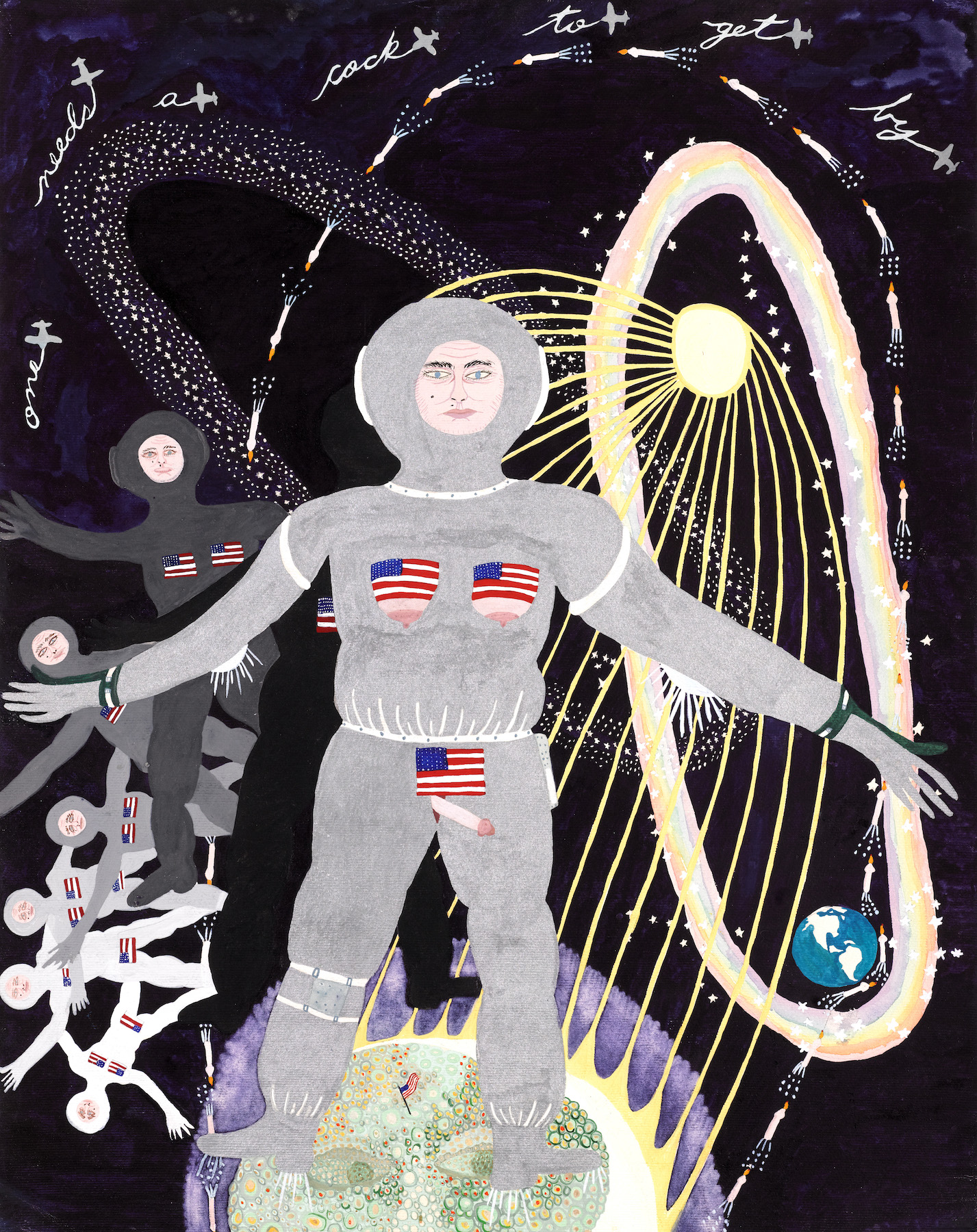
Woman Landing on Man in the Moon, Watercolor on Paper, 20"x18" (1971)

Ann Leda Shapiro taught art at San Francisco State College, University of Arizona, University of Colorado and University of Texas where she volunteered at a Chinese medical clinic for people with AIDS. Inspired to research and illustrate east asian medical history and visual case studies she enrolled in acupuncture school, moved to Seattle to study, became a board certified acupuncturist and has been in private practice on a small island in Puget Sound since 1991.

The healing practice remains a critical influence in her lifelong contemplation of the body and environment and how our inner and outer worlds interconnect. Shapiro is also the author of a picture book "My Island," published in 2009 and "Art Notes of an Acupuncturist" published in 2015 as a comic book in the style of a graphic novel.

== Permanent collections ==
Her work is included in the collections of the:

- Frye Art Museum, Seattle WA (2023)
- 4Culture Seattle, WA (2021)
- Seattle Art Museum, Seattle, WA (2015)
- University of Arizona, Tucson, AZ (1983)
- University of Colorado Boulder Art Museum. (1980)
- University of California, Davis, CA. (1971)
