= Lonny Schiff =

American artist (1929–2000)

- Born: Mary Ellin Clark; 1929; Columbus, Ohio, U.S.
- Died: December 7, 2000 (aged 71)

Mary Ellin Schiff (née Clark, 1929 – December 7, 2000), better known as Lonny Schiff, was an American artist. Her work is included in the collections of the Smithsonian American Art Museum and the Harvard Art Museums, Schiff died on December 7, 2000, at the age of 71.
