= Randi Matushevitz =

American artist

Randi Chaplin Matushevitz (born in Rochester, New York in 1965) is an American artist known for her work in ‘charcoal, ink, pastel, spray-paint, and acrylic; graffiti-like mark-making, gestural strokes, collage-like stencils’ whose ‘moody, urban-baroque vision evoke a dark fairy tale world.’ Contemporary Art Curator Magazine noted, "Her recent portraits investigate uncertainty, and reflect the reactive mania or calm surrounding layers of wear and tear on the soul..."

== Education ==
Matushevitz received her Master of Fine Arts at the University of Miami, in Coral Gables, FL and her Bachelor of the Arts at the California State University, Northridge. Chaplin did not set out to be artist. A chemistry major, she took a drawing class thinking "it would be easy," and instead discovered a physical process that mirrored her internal one.

== Early career ==
After obtaining her MFA from University of Miami, she was accepted into the Vermont Studio Residency program. She also showed internationally in Buenos Aires, Caracas, Madrid and Xalapa, as well as in New York before moving to Las Vegas.

Matushevitz has shown internationally, most recently in Italy for "Beyond the Veil, Women Art, Markers Xl" which debuted during the 2019 Venice Art Bienniale, and "We Are Humanity, Lilli Mueller and Randi Matushevitz," at Giudecca Art Center (2019); in Berlin in conjunction with Enter Art Foundation (2018); as a Painting Art Award Finalist at the inaugural Global Art Awards in Dubai (2017); and in 2002 at Museo Provincial de Bellas Artes Emilio Pettoruti (Buenos Aires) as well as at institutions and museums throughout the western United States, including a 2006 solo show at the Las Vegas Art Museum. Her works are included in the permanent collections of the Museum of Art and History (MOAH), Lancaster, CA; Cleveland Clinic, Las Vegas; Las Vegas Art Museum at the Marjorie Barrick Museum of Art, University of Nevada, Las Vegas; and Enter Art Foundation.

Matushevitz's work prior to 2016 was predominantly installation based and dealt with feminist issues. She has since begun to focus on “narratives that echo life in the 21st century” with an emphasis on wider social conditions. This shift in focus has led to an ongoing series of “Ugly Faces” portraits.
