= Victoria Cabezas =

American artist

Victoria Cabezas Green (born 1950), is an American photographer, conceptual artist and multimedia artist who has developed her production in Costa Rica.

== Biography ==
Victoria Cabezas was born in the United States, but was raised and educated in Costa Rica, and later attended the Pratt Institute in New York City and Florida State University. Her areas of specialization in the visual arts are in printmaking, photography, and work with objects, studying each of these disciplines and incorporating them into her artistic practice. She has also taught design and photography at the School of Plastic Arts of the University of Costa Rica, where she served as Dean of the Faculty of Fine Arts from 1991 to 1995.

Solo exhibitions of her work have been shown at the Mexican Council of Photography, the David Rockefeller Center for Latin American Studies at Harvard University and the Museum of Contemporary Art and Design of Costa Rica. She has also exhibited in group shows in the United States, Spain, France, Costa Rica, Guatemala and Peru.

== Artistic work ==
Cabezas's work revolves around “experimenting with photographic language, as well as investigating the elements of Costa Rican religiousness and its representations in the quotidian sphere.” The use of a kitsch aesthetic is evident in much of Cabezas’ work, and manifested in the “record of private spaces, loaded with cultural meaning through objects, which in turn refer to other more complex, temporal and symbolic social systems.” Another recurring issue in her artistic research is the problem of tropicality experienced and understood from the perspective of Central America. This particular subject is addressed by through her use of banana imagery, seen as the visual icon par excellence to denote the socioeconomic exploitation suffered by the isthmus in the past. The use of the image of bananas in object assemblages also led the artist to make her first works related to the art-object in the region during the eighties. Cabezas’ other artistic concerns revolve around personal memory, the relationship between the viewer and the work, and questions about discourse and the codes of contemporary art in general.

== Works ==
2000 - La Historia Oficial. Assemblage (documents, Coca-Cola bottles, donuts, fabric, frame, digital photography, acrylic sheets). 282 x 412 cm

1973- Banana Thesis. Copy her MFA thesis at Florida State University. 21.59 x 27.94 cm.

1998 - Detalle del portal de doña Antonia Mora. Color photograph with colloidal silver (framed). 50 x 60 cm.

== Exhibitions ==
- 2019 – Victoria Cabezas and Priscilla Monge: Give Me What You Ask For, Americas Society, New York
- 2018 – Radical Women: Latin American Art, 1960-1985, Brooklyn Museum of Art, New York
- 2012 – Propio y Ajeno, Museo de Arte y Diseño Contemporáneo, San José, Costa Rica.
- 1998-1999 – No todo lo que brilla es oro, David Rockefeller Center for Latin American Studies, Harvard University, Cambridge, Massachusetts.
- 1997 – Obra reciente de Victoria Cabezas, Galería José Luis López Escarré, Teatro Nacional, San José, Costa Rica.
- 1984 – Mujeres, Gatos y Televisores – Fotografías de Victoria Cabezas, Consejo Mexicano de Fotografía, A.C., México, D.F.
- 1983 – Fotografías de Victoria Cabezas, Museo de Arte Costarricence, San José, Costa Rica.
- 1983 – Fotografías de Victoria Cabezas, Centro Cultural Costarricence Norteamericano y Escuela de Artes Plásticas de la Universidad de Costa Rica, San José, Costa Rica.
- 1974 – Victoria Cabezas y Fernán Meza, Centro Cultural Costarricence Norteamericano, San José

== Sources ==
- Lectura on Banana Thesis, TEOR/éTica, 2013. Available on YouTube: Banana Thesis: Lectura de tesis por Victoria Cabezas- 12 set. 2012
- Exhibition catalogue for Propio y Ajeno, Museo de Arte y Diseño Contemporáneo, Costa Rica, 2012: Propio y Ajeno. Victoria Cabezas.
