= Clara Skinner =

American printmaker

Clara Skinner (1902–1976) was an American printmaker known for her woodcuts.

Her work is included in the collections of the Seattle Art Museum, the Dallas Museum of Art the National Gallery of Art, Washington and the Metropolitan Museum of Art.
