= Rachel Schmeidler =

Rachel Schmeidler is an American multi-media artist based in Los Angeles known for transforming celebrity mugshots into art. She explores themes of celebrity culture and communal schadenfreude. Her work includes techniques ranging from painting and traditional silkscreening to experimental anaglyphic stereoscopic photography.

== Early life and education ==
Rachel Schmeidler was born in Israel and moved to Germany when she was two years old. Her father, a Holocaust survivor, moved the family to the Philadelphia, PA when she was 12. Schmeidler graduated from Carnegie Mellon University.

== Artwork ==
Schmeidler has produced a series of artwork based on the mug shots of celebrities titled Hollywood Most Wanted. She used traditional silk screening printmaking techniques and new imaging technology in the production of the images. She also utilizes 3D stereo photography in her multi-media work. Her work has received attention from both the traditional and celebrity media. Subsequent series using mug shots expanded her subjects to include Jewish, Irish and Italian mobsters – in attempt to explore American history, immigration, and the Americana.

== Charity work ==
Schmeidler is founder of Hollywood Least Wanted, a charitable organization dedicated to assisting the needy in Los Angeles, in particular homeless animals facing euthanasia at Los Angeles’ animal shelters.
