= Jessie Rose Vala =

American artist (born 1977)

Jessie Rose Vala (born 1977, Madison, Wisconsin) is an American installation artist working in drawing, painting, ceramic, paper sculpture, and video. She received an MFA from University of Oregon and a BFA in painting and ceramic sculpture from California College of the Arts in Oakland, California. Her work explores non-linear narratives and environments through an ongoing investigation of the shifting relationships to ourselves and our surroundings. Throughout her work is a questioning of the boundaries between animate and inanimate, the rational and the supernatural, science and spirituality. Installation and multi-channel video allows Vala’s work to negate hierarchy, allowing for multiplicity of connections and realities.

Vala is part of the collaboration Light Hits, creating installations, music, and videos with artist Kelie Bowman. In 2014 Vala started Ungrund Collective, showcasing videos of five contemporary artists working within similar humanistic inquiries. Vala’s work has been exhibited nationally and internationally including exhibitions in San Francisco, Miami, Portland, New York, Tokyo and Mexico.
