= Fay Morgan Taylor =

American Modernist artist

- Born: Fay Christina Morgan Taylor; 25 June 1909; Pittsburgh, Pennsylvania
- Died: 25 June 1990 (aged 81); Novato, California
- Known for: Painting
- Movement: Modernist
- Spouse: Farwell Taylor (m. 1935)

Fay Christina Morgan Taylor (June 25, 1909 – Sept 19, 1990) was an American Modernist artist.

Untitled, 1952

== Life and work ==
Taylor was born in Pittsuburg in 1909, and in 1930 she moved to San Francisco after studying at the University of Washington in Seattle. Taylor studied at the California School of Fine Arts, and in 1934 she graduated from UC Berkeley.

In 1935 Taylor married Farwell Taylor who was also an artist. They had studio together in San Francisco until 1949 when they moved to Mill Valley. Taylor continued to live there until the mid 1980s when arson destroyed her home and all its contents. After the fire, Taylor moved to Novato, California, where she lived until she died in 1990.

Taylor was a modernist painter who worked in both oils and acrylics and whose work included abstracts and philosophical studies. Taylor exhibited at: San Francisco Art Association; San Francisco Museum of Modern Art, 1935; Rotunda Gallery, City of Paris; Shasta State Historical Museum.
