= Grace H. Murray =

American artist

- Born: November 9, 1872; New York City
- Died: November 9, 1944 (aged 71–72)

Grace H. Murray (9 November 1872 – 1944) was an American watercolor painter. Murray studied under William Bouguereau at the Académie Julian in Paris.

Her work is included in the collections of the Smithsonian American Art Museum and the Brooklyn Museum.
