= Marilyn Scott-Waters =

American writer

Marilyn Scott-Waters (born 1958) is a children's book illustrator and author living in Southern California. A graduate of UC Irvine, she holds a Bachelor of Arts Degree in comparative literature. She authored the online graphic novel The Return of Doctor Dragonwagon, the book: The Toymaker, Paper Toys You Can Make Yourself, and has illustrated the books Bowregarde, Bowregarde's Hospital Handbook, and The Search for Vile Things. Scott-Waters is a member of the Society of Children's Book Illustrators, winner of the SCBWI 2005 National Picture Book Portfolio Award, and a member of the children's book literature salon: Studio 5.

Scott-Waters is commonly known as The Toymaker, because of the international popularity of her pet project, a paper toys website featuring free paper toy designs and instructions for downloading and printout. The stated goal of the website is "to help grownups and kids spend time together making things." The whimsical paper engineering website has drawn attention from news outlets internationally, and has made Scott-Waters a well-known proponent of the movement toward online creative expression, responsible child rearing, and artistic self-employment.
