= Renee McGinnis =

American artist based in Chicago (born 1962)

- Born: March 14, 1962 (age 63)
- Spouse: Andres Buenaventura (m.)
- Children: 2

Renee McGinnis (born 1962) is an American artist based in Chicago who is widely known for her depictions of rusting mega-structures imbedded in various forms of beauty. Her primary subjects include Battersea Power Station in London, the extinct steel mills of the eastern United States and the great north Atlantic Luxury liners of the early 20th century. Much of her work uses these structures as metaphor. B. David Zarley, Chicago Contributor at New American Paintings wrote of her subjects, "they are impossible; affronts to reality and the realities of the physical world, they are the inevitable avatars of a vicious cycle of horror and pulchritude, one which has spun as long as civilization, powered by wind, sinew, and steam but with the desires of humanity always the engine."

== Biography and career ==
McGinnis grew up on a farm in central Illinois where her Irish-American ancestors have owned farms since the later half of the 19th century. Her mother's ancestors immigrated from Norway and Denmark in the later half of the 19th century. In Norway the family built luxury yachts for the British market. This ended when the steel-hulled ships became more desirable. She attended Illinois Wesleyan University, earning a BFA in 1984 and continued with graduate work in sociology and anthropology at the University of Chicago.

She has exhibited widely in Chicago and has also been shown in Germany, Australia, New York City, Washington D.C. and Baltimore, Md. Her curatorial debut occurred when she launched “The Chicago Solution Show 2003″ with the late Ed Paschke as juror, then again in 2005 with Art Institute of Chicago Curator of contemporary Collections James Rondeau. The exhibition showcased work expressing "solutions" to our global problems rather than simply express the problem itself.

In 2002, she starred as herself in the Iranian-American film by director Hossein Khandan "American Burqa" screened at The Gene Siskel Film Center, Chicago, Illinois. McGinnis is married to Andres Buenaventura and has two children. She is currently represented by Zg Gallery in Chicago.

== Sources ==
- Website: www.reneemcginnis.com
- Zg Gallery
- New City - Indulging in Departures from Reality 2017
- Sports Illustrated - NFL Biennial 2016: Matching teams up with modern artists 2016
- New American Paintings - Renee Mcginis: The Lazarus Fleet 2015
- WTTW - Artbeat: Inside the Arts Blog - Ship Shape 2013
- Hi-Fructose - Inside the Studio of Renee McGinnis 2013
