= Lynda Watson =

American metalsmith and jeweler (born 1940)

- Born: 1940 (age 85–86); Orange, California, United States
- Other name: Lynda Watson–Abbott
- Education: California State University, Long Beach
- Known for: Metalsmithing
- Website: lyndawatsonart.com

Lynda Watson (born 1940) is an American metalsmith, jeweler, and educator.

She attended California State University, Long Beach. Her work has been described as Visual Diaries. Watson taught at Cabrillo College from 1970 through 1995. In 1995 a retrospective of her work Beautiful Objects: The Work of Lynda Watson-Abbott was shown at the Santa Cruz Museum of Art.

Watson was named the Metal Museum's 2022 Master Metalsmith, and a retrospective of her work Looking Back was held the same year. Her work is in the collection of the Smithsonian American Art Museum.
