= Jill Moser =

American artist

- Born: 1956 (age 69–70); New York City

Jill Moser is a New York-based artist whose paintings, drawings, prints, collages and artist's books explore the intersections of painting, writing, and the animated image.

== Early life and education ==
Moser graduated from Brown University in 1978 and was the recipient of the Brooklyn Museum's Max Beckmann Scholarship in Painting. She received her MFA from Hunter College in 1981. From 1981-1991 she was Associate Director of Materials for the Arts for the NYC Department of Cultural Affairs.

== Career ==
She has been on the faculty of Princeton University, Virginia Commonwealth University, SUNY New Paltz, SUNY Empire State College, The School of Visual Arts, and has lectured widely across the United States. Her work has been exhibited in galleries and museums throughout the United States and Europe, and featured in prominent public and private collections.

Since the 1980s, Moser has been expanding and rewriting the legacies of gestural abstraction. Engaged with the work of choreographers and filmmakers including Maya Deren, Stan Brakhage and Teresa De Keersmaeker as well as women artists such as Lynda Benglis and Joan Mitchell, her paintings, drawings and collages have been addressing the relationship between mark making practices, performative gestures, passages of time, and the moving body.

In her extensive work with printmakers, Moser investigates gestural indices and colors and remediates the connection between the hand-made and mechanical. She has created numerous editions with Jungle Press, Manneken Press, Brand X, Burnet Editions, and others.

More recently, Moser's gestural repertoire has found new forms and media in collaborative projects with poets, artists and designers/architects.

== Artist Books / Collaborations ==
Nude Palette: A Volley, with poet Anna Maria Hong (2020)

And Solar Wind, with poet Laurie Sheck (2019)

Urban Renewal, with poet Major Jackson, The Southampton Review, vol. X, no. 2 (Summer-Fall 2016)

The Introvert, with the poet Charles Bernstein (Gervais Jassaud, France, 2010)

== Collections ==
- Arkansas Art Center
- Achenbach Foundation for Graphic Arts of the Fine Arts Museums of San Francisco
- Art Institute of Chicago
- Brooklyn Museum
- Harvard Art Museums
- Kalamazoo Institute of Arts
- Metropolitan Museum of Art
- Museum of Fine Arts Houston
- Museum of Modern Art, New York
- National Gallery of Art, Washington
- National Library of France
- Smithsonian American Art Museum
- Weatherspoon Art Museum
- Yale University Art Gallery
- Beinecke Rare Book & Manuscript Library

== Bibliography ==
- Boyle, Fintan and Nichols, Jennie. Studio Visit: Jill Moser, https://www.romanovgrave.com/studio-visits/jill-moser, March 2018
- Carey, Brainard. Jill Moser Interview, Yale Radio, https://museumofnonvisibleart.com/interviews/jillmoser/%5B%5D, May 2017
- Hirsch, Faye. A Seemingly Effortless Gesture is Choreographed into an Emptied Field, Art in Print, Volume 5, Number 6, 2016
- McAdam, Alfred. Jill Moser at Lennon, Weinberg, ARTnews, Summer 2012
