= Deborah Mesa-Pelly =

American artist

Deborah Mesa-Pelly (born 1968) is a Cuban-born American artist. Her work is included in the collections of the Whitney Museum of American Art, the Seattle Art Museum and the International Center of Photography.
