= Marsha Steinberg =

American painter

Marsha Steinberg (born 1946, Los Angeles, California, United States) is a Florentine artist, whose works include drawings, etchings and paintings. She is Coordinator of the Studio Art Program at the California State University Program, Florence and is professor of painting at the Italian International Institute, Lorenzo de' Medici in Florence, Italy.

== Education and training ==
In 1974, Steinberg moved to Florence, Italy, to further her training and education. She received her degree in painting from the Accademia di Belle Arti di Firenze while enrolled at the California State University International Program where she received her Master's in Art. In addition, she completed a specialization in etching at Il Bisonte, International School of Advanced Printmaking in Florence where she later worked as assistant.

== Years in the Maremma ==
In the 1970s, she began a period of study and research in the untamed region in Southern Tuscany, known as the Maremma, that was to last for nearly ten years. This is where she produced works in various media that reflect her personal relationship with nature and where Greek mythology plays an important role featured in the recurring presence of bulls in her subject matter.

== Recent works ==
Her most recent series of paintings is called Cattivi Maestri e Donna/Iniquitous Masters and Woman, in which the artist represents herself in front of paint-ings by her heroes, the Abstract Expressionists, Rothko, Gorky, and De Koon-ing.

== Galleries ==
She is represented in New York City by Danette Koke Fine Art and in Florence by Linea Spazio Arte Contemporanea Gallery

== Publications ==
The following publications feature Marsha Steinberg:

- "An Interview with Marsha Steinberg" Danielsen, Marissa, FLO'N THE GO, Florence, 2012.
- California State University Summer Arts, Florence, 2012.
- "Artist Profile: Marsha Steinberg", Lamas, Lilia, blog publication, Florence, 2009.
- "Creazione dal nulla & Icaro e il labirinto di via Fani" Marsha Steinberg e Swietlan Kraczyna, 2005, presentatione di Rolando Bellini, Consiglio Regionale della Toscana, Palazzo Panciatichi, Firenze
- "Arte, doppia mostra e Palazzo Panciatichi", 2-2-05, Il Parlamento della Toscana, Firenze
- "Le creazioni dal nulla e il gioco del labirinto", 6-2-05, LA STAMPA, Cultura e Spettocoli, di Fiorella Minervino
- "I disegni esposti a Palazzo Panciatichi", 4-2-05, Corriere di Firenze, di Chiara Bini
- Giornata di Studio “Vecchi e Nuovi Sintomi nella Cura Analitica”, 1998, Scuola Europea di Psicoanalisi, Sezione Italiana, Palazzo degli Affari, Firenze : incisione originale, grafica design - programma
- "Marsha Steinberg e Sylvia B. Teri", 1996, presentazione di Rolando Bellini e Paola Bortolotti, Palazzo Comunale, Empoli,: catalogo
- Il Segno di Empoli, Empoli, Rivista Trimestrale dell'Associazione Turistica Pro Empoli, Anno 8 - N. 34, Giugno 1996, "Due artiste americane"
- "Dipinti e Acqueforti", 1993, presentazione di Rolando Bellini, Comune di Prato, Prato,: depliant
- "Monotipi Americani", 1993, presentazione di Rolando Bellini, Provincia di Firenze, Firenze: catalogo
- "Quattrocento", 1992, presentazione di Rolando Bellini, Galleria Davanzati, Firenze: monotipo originale
- "Paesaggi", 1992, presentazione di Rolando Bellini, Galleria Davanzati, Firenze: incisone originale
- "Eros e Psyche", 1992, presentazione di Rolando Bellini, Galleria Davanzati, Firenze: incisione originale
- "Storie", 1991, presentazione di Rolando Bellini, Provincia di Firenze, Firenze: catalogo
- "Ritratto di Jacques Lacan", 1991, Campo Freudiano, Istituto Freudiano per la Clinica, la Terapia e la Scienza, Roma,: incisione originale
- "Omaggio alla Psicoanalisi", 1991, Campo Freudiano, Istituto Freudiano per la Clinica, la Terapia e la Scienza, Roma,: incisione originale
- Techniche 3, Milano, Ed. Riza, Anno 2, Numero 1, Marzo 1990, "Opere di MarshaSteinberg"
- "Eros e Psyche", 1989, presentazione di Renzo Federici: cartella di otto inci-sioni originali
- "Dipinti e Acqueforti", 1989, Azienda Autonoma di Turismo, presentazione di Renzo Federici, Firenze: catalogo
- Marsha Steinberg : dipinti e acqueforti : Firenze, Logia Rucellai. - Firenze : Fondazione sigma-tau, [1980?]. - 13 p.: ill. color. 24 cm

Classificazione: 759.5 [21] Biblioteca delle Oblate: Misc. 481 13

- Marsha Steinberg: dipinti e acqueforti : Firenze, Loggia Rucellai. - [S. l. : s. n., 199-] (Firenze : Pochini). - 13 p.: ill.; 24 cm Classificazione: 759.13 [21] 10904017 Firenze [AC686] Biblioteca del Consiglio - Biblioteca dell'Identità Tosca-na:BIT9.511FIR75MAR Kantzas, P. Ritorno a Freud, Pisa, ETS Editrice, 1988: incisione originale di Marsha Steinberg -"Freud a Londra".
- Firenze 1986 Capitale Europea della Cultura: Itinerari della Psiche. Le Passioni dell'Anima in Europa"); Cinque Seminari Altamente Specializzati" CE.R.ME. Centro di Ricerca Mentale, Palazzo Medici Riccardi, Firenze: disegno originale in china "Eros andPsyche", grafica design - poster, invito, programma e block notes.

== Selected Permanent collections in museums ==
Marsha Steinberg's work is part of the following permanent collections:

- The New Primitives Collection, The Museum of Peace, dedicated to Galileo Galilei, Vico Nel Lazio,
- Museum of Contemporary Art, Florina, Greece
- Gallery of Modern Art, the Municipality of Empoli, Empoli

== Selection of private collections ==
Her artwork is part of the following private collections:

- Ristorante Dino, Fiesole, Italy
- Baroness Charlotte Ricasoli, Florence, Italy
- Time Warner, New York, USA
- Atria Senior Living Group, Manhattan, New York, USA
- Price Waterhouse, New York, USA
- Delta Air Lines, VIP First Class, Kennedy Airport, New York, USA
- British Airways, VIP First Class, Atlanta Airport, Giorgia, USA
- Salvo Andò, Ministry of Defense, Italy
- Francine Ellman Gallery, Santa Monica, California, USA
- Prime Minister Bettino Craxi, Italy
- Pres. Sigma - tau, Rome, Italy
- Prof. Panaiotis Kantzas, Fiesole, Italy
- Restaurant Mezzaluna, London, England
- California State University International Program, Florence, Italy
- Ristorante la Giunca, Poggio a Caiano, Prato, Italy
- Nance Bornn, Los, Angeles, California, USA
- Deana Izen Miller Gallery, Santa Monica, California, USA
- Danette Koke Fine Art, New York, USA
- California State University International Programs, Long Beach, Calif., USA
- Ambassador, Marisa Lino, Arlington, Washington, D.C., USA
- Anna Chimenti Sorgi, Rome, Italy
- Gen. Leonardo Tricarico, General Aeronautics District, Rome, Italy
- Michael Mitchell, Los Angeles, California, USA
- Scuola Europea di Psicoanalisi, Sezione Italiana, Roma, Italy
