= Millie Rose Lalk =

American painter

- Born: 1895; Whitewater, Wisconsin
- Died: 1943; Fort Atkinson, Wisconsin
- Education: Chicago Art Institute
- Known for: Oil Painting

Millie Rose Lalk (1895 – 1943) was an American painter based in Wisconsin. Her most notable work was produced in the last few years of her life.

== Work ==
- Our Farm Buildings, oil painting.
- They're Cute When They're Small, oil painting.
