= Linda St. Clair =

American contemporary wildlife painter (born 1952)

- Born: 1952 (age 73–74); Franklin, Tennessee, United States
- Known for: Contemporary Artist
- Website: LindaStClair.com

Linda St. Clair (born 1952 and died on October 14, 2018) was an American contemporary wildlife painter. She was known for her portrayal of vibrant roosters, cows, and other barnyard, domestic and wild animals. Her work has been acclaimed for its ability to capture an animal's attitude and personality. Themes of pride, love and motherhood are found in her works.

== Career ==
Influenced by artists of the Southwest, St. Clair began exploring a greater variety of approaches in her own work. She began using looser brush strokes and bolder colors to convey the illusion of detail and a more contemporary perspective than earlier works.
