= Audrey Ushenko =

American painter

Audrey Ushenko (born in 1945) is an American realist figurative painter who usually works in oils. She is Professor of Drawing/Painting at Indiana University – Purdue University Fort Wayne.

== Early life and education ==
Ushenko was born in Princeton, New Jersey. She earned a painting certification from the Art Institute of Chicago in (1964), a Bachelor of Arts in English literature at Indiana University Bloomington in 1965, a Master of Arts in painting at Northwestern University in 1967, and a doctoral degree in art history at Northwestern University in 1978.

== Work ==
Ushenko has had more than 20 solo shows and participated in numerous group exhibitions. She is represented by Denise Bibro Fine Art in New York City.

Ushenko's background in English literature has influenced her work as a painter, but she also she draws on Greek mythology, seventeenth- and eighteenth-century images, and everyday social interactions. She typically manipulates light and shadow, which lends her work an impressionist style. The art critic Gerrit Henry called Ushenko "a master chronicler of realities small and large," noting that she enlivens even inanimate objects. Ushenko sometimes uses herself as a model, as do many artists; she has stated that this is mostly out of convenience, not autobiography.

Ushenko sometimes paints figural groups, often in their authentic surroundings, but seeks to explore the nature of social interaction through her relationship to the natural and constructed worlds, and by questioning their relationships. She routinely paints the same model in related positions, although they often contrast; for example, one model may be portrayed in shade and the other in full sunlight, which subtly reveals a sense of duality and dichotomy. In many of Ushenko's paintings, something appears to have just happened or is just about to occur.

According to Ushenko, the meaning of a work develops as she paints, rather than being determined from the outset. In Vanitas VIII, for example, there appear to be five images of Ushenko in one room, which seems to comment on the multiple faces that each person has and displays, often in a single day. In her painting at the Duchossois Center for Advanced Medicine at the University of Chicago Hospitals, she was so inspired by the "magnitude of the ongoing human drama being quietly played out day after day" in the hospital that she wanted to create a work to display it. Patients and staff were able to watch Ushenko paint and many were incorporated into the three-story monument.
