= Kara Shepherd =

African-American surrealist painter (1911–1984)

- Born: Carrie B. Shepherd; February 18, 1911; Culpeper, Virginia, U.S.
- Died: October 8, 1984 (aged 73); Phoenix, Arizona, U.S.
- Occupation: Painter

Carrie B. Shepherd (February 18, 1911 - October 8, 1984), better known as Kara Shepherd, was an African-American surrealist painter.

== Biography ==
A native of Culpeper, Virginia, Shepherd was born as Carrie B. Shepherd on February 18, 1911, on the family farm. She early expressed an interest in art, receiving encouragement from her parents. She studied at the Philadelphia School of Art in 1926; the Art Students League of New York in 1950; Fordham University in 1960; the École des Beaux-Arts, Fontainelbleau from 1962 to 1964; and Arizona State University from 1979 to 1980. Her work is represented in public and private collections.

Shepherd had two daughters, Gerylln and Phyllis. She was a member of the Unitarian Church in Phoenix, Arizona. She died on October 8, 1984, in Phoenix.
