= Sono Osato (artist) =

American artist (born 1960)

- Born: January 1, 1960 (age 66); Baden-Baden, Germany
- Education: Arizona State University, California College of the Arts
- Known for: Painter
- Website: sonoosato.com

Sono Osato (born January 1, 1960) is an American artist born in Baden Baden, Germany. She attended Arizona State University and California College of the Arts. Osato's work includes sculptures and paintings. Both often include found objects, such as machine parts and animal bones. Her work attempts to blend the boundaries between artistic disciplines. Her works, the Silent Language and Buried Language series, deal primarily with the intersection of language and topography.

== Education ==
Osato attended the Bemis Art School in Colorado Springs, Colorado from age five to 18, where she determined art was her calling. She received a Bachelor of Fine Arts degree from Arizona State University in 1983 and a Master of Fine Arts degree from the California College of Art in 1986.

== Collections ==
Osato's painting Meena is part of the permanent collection at the de Young Museum in San Francisco.

== Personal life ==
Osato remained in San Francisco creating and teaching art before moving to New York City in 2001. A month-long visit to Austin, Texas in 2016 eventually turned into a permanent relocation. She said the city has provided her "a gentler pace of everyday life so that I can focus on my work with determined concentration."
