= Ariele Alasko =

American sculptor

Ariele Alasko is a designer and woodworker from New York City. Her early work consists of furniture and art from re-purposed wood arranged in patterns. She gained popularity on Instagram with a curated feed of cutting boards, handmade spoons, her Brooklyn studio, and her dog.

In 2015, Alasko had 370,000 followers on Instagram, and by 2016, it was 418,000 followers. She achieved notoriety for her carved wooden spoons and sculptures which were sold at a high price and were copied by other artists.

In 2018, she began making stout, squiggly, table brushes with wood and tampico fibers that sold out immediately on her web store.
