= Mary Pillsbury Weston =

American painter

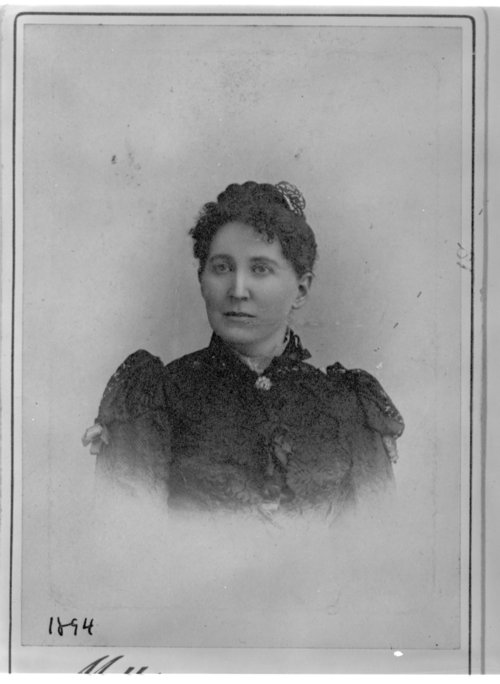
A cabinet card showing Mary Bartlett Pillsbury Weston

Mary Bartlett Pillsbury Weston (January 5, 1817 – April 25, 1895) was an American painter of the 19th century. She was a landscape and portrait painter, known for her works such as “The Spirit of Kansas.” As a child she had always wanted to be an artist, even attempting to run away two times to pursue a career in art. As a young adult she met Valentine Weston and they moved to New York, so that he could help her become an artist. After three months of living together in New York they got married in 1840, where she lived until her husband died in 1863; she then moved to Lawrence, Kansas, in 1873.

== Family and Background ==
Mary Bartlett Pillsbury Weston was born on January 5, 1817, in Hebron, New Hampshire, to Baptist Minister Steven Pillsbury (October 30, 1781 – January 22, 1851) and Lavinia Hobart (October 31, 1796 – October 29, 1871). She was one of ten children; there was also a half-sister.

== Getting Into Art ==
At a young age Mary Pillsbury Weston was very intrigued by art. So much so that she ran away from home two separate times to pursue a career as an artist. In 1837, she moved to Willington, Connecticut, where she started working by painting portraits for families who lived in the area. During her time in Willington, she met a New Yorker by the name of Valentine Weston who she became acquainted with. They moved back to New York together when Valentine invited Mary to come back with him to learn more about art. Valentine employed artists to come and help teach Mary about art and how to become an artist. Three months later they got married where they lived until Valentine’s death in 1863. After her husband’s death she bounced around the East Coast of the United States before settling down in Lawrence, Kansas in 1873.

== The Spirit of Kansas ==
Mary Pillsbury Weston was known as a portrait and landscape painter who had many works of art but none being more famous than The Spirit of Kansas. The Spirit of Kansas was painted for display at the 1893 World’s Columbian Exposition in Chicago. She wished for “the state of Kansas to move forward peacefully” and wanted the painting to express that. The Spirit of Kansas is now in the Kansas Museum of History.

== See also ==
- Landscape Painting
