= Gladys Ames Brannigan =

American artist

- Born: Gladys Ames; June 14, 1882; Hingham, Massachusetts, United States
- Died: April 24, 1944 (aged 61); New York City, United States
- Known for: Painting, Muralist

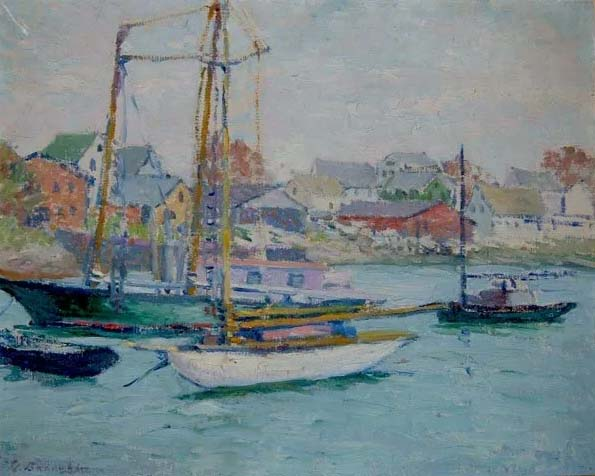
Harbor Scene

Gladys Ames Brannigan (1882–1944) was an American painter and muralist known for her work with the Works Progress Administration (WPA).

== Biography ==
Brannigan née Ames was born on June 14, 1882, in Hingham, Massachusetts. She attended Georgetown University and the Corcoran College of Art and Design, both in Washington, D.C. In New York she studied at the Art Students League of New York and the National Academy of Design. She married the attorney Robert A. Brannigan.

From 1929 through 1941 the couple maintained residences in New Hampshire and New York City. Brannigan worked on several WPA murals in New Hampshire; at Dover City Hall, Keene State College, Portsmouth Junior High School, and the University of New Hampshire. The Dover City Hall mural is in the is on the second floor and depicts early scenes of Dover. The murals at the University of New Hampshire are in the Newspaper Room. The murals from Portsmouth Junior High School showing scenes from Portsmouth history were dedicated in 1936 have since gone missing.

For a time in the 1930s Brannigan was the Chair of the art department, Hollins College in Roanoke, Virginia. She also taught at Montana State College in the 1930s and 1940s. She died in New York City on April 24, 1944.
