= Nancy Lawton =

American artist

- Self-Portrait, 1990
- Born: 1950; Gilroy, California
- Died: 2007 (aged 56–57); Albany, New York

Nancy Lawton (1950–2007) was an American artist. Originally working in graphite to create botanical drawings and portraits, Lawton began working in silverpoint in 1985. Her work is included in the collections of the Smithsonian American Art Museum, the Art Institute of Chicago, the Metropolitan Museum of Art and the Brooklyn Museum of Art.
