= Leemour Pelli =

American artist

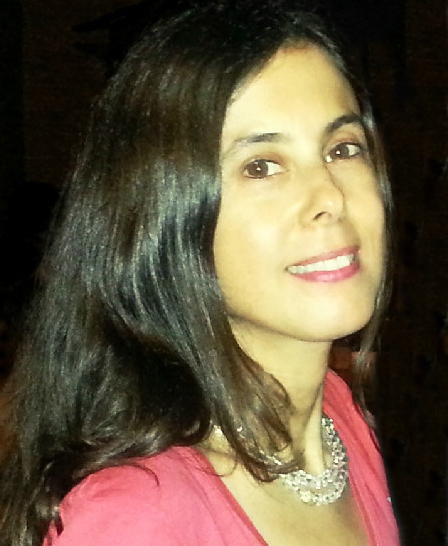
- Leemour Pelli in New York City
- Born: New York City, United States
- Education: Hunter College, MA in art history
- Alma mater: School of Visual Arts, New York City, BFA in painting
- Known for: Figurative and Abstract Paintings, Sculpture, Prints
- Website: www.leemourpelli.com

Leemour Pelli is an American artist living and working in New York City. She is primarily a painter and she also makes sculpture, works on paper, installation, prints, and photography.

== Biography ==
Leemour Pelli was born in New York City. Pelli received a Bachelor of Fine Arts degree in Painting from the School of Visual Arts in New York and she earned a master's degree in art history from Hunter College. Pelli also studied at the Ecole Nationale Superieure des Beaux Arts, the Academie Charpentiere in Paris, Cornell University, and the Bezalel Academy of Art in Jerusalem.

== Work ==
Pelli's work resembles medical imagery and x-rays in the way she depicts anatomy and the organs of the body, including the heart, rib cages, and lungs by seeing through the figure itself. Distorted human figures appear with enlarged ribcages and hearts, overlapping lungs, and other anatomical organs such as intestines. According to curator Robin Reisenfeld, Pelli's works use "anatomical and skeletal parts as a means to give physical presence to intangible emotional states and allude to the porous border between inner and outer states of reality."

Lisa Turvey writes in her Artforum review of Pelli's 2008 exhibition at Daneyal Mahmoud Gallery, which included paintings and sculpture, that Pelli's work is a "rumination on the life force as pitted against the certainties of bone and death." Her figures are shown in heightened states of emotion, solitude, love and connection through saturated color and gesture of the brushwork. Turvey continues “she uses an ontological bait and switch of representing skeletons, parts and whole, as animate entities trying to commune with one another. This manifests itself in...'transferlike smudges'."

Poetry and literature are a source of inspiration for Pelli's work. She has cited the writing and ideas of Robert Frost, Samuel Beckett, Ted Hughes' Crow poems, and others as being influences on her work. Pelli develops personas and narratives from these writers' work and her titles are often references this.

Pelli's use of washes and transparent layered color are juxtaposed with dense marks. Barry Schwabsky writes in a review of her work in The New York Times in 2000 "The color is soft and diaphanous in feeling, and yet the paint has been laid on thickly in blunt horizontal strokes. These color fields manage to be both atmospheric and obdurate at once."

Pelli's work is the public collection of the Flint Institute of Art in Flint, Michigan.

== Solo and two-person exhibitions ==
Solo and two-person exhibitions:

- 2009 Annina Nosei Gallery, New York, NY
- 2008 My Heart is in my Stomach, Daneyal Mahmood Gallery, New York, NY
- 2005 Recent Paintings, Annina Nosei Gallery, New York, NY
- 2005 "Love," said God, say "Love," The Icehouse Gallery, Greenport, New York
- 2005 "Love," said God, say "Love," Flying Space, Sag Harbor, New York
- 2004 From the Heart, Annina Nosei Gallery, New York
- 2003 The Art Gallery of the University of Central Florida, Orlando, FL
- 2003 New works by Jen Petreshock and Leemour Pelli, Matthew Izzo Gallery, Philadelphia, PA
- 2000 Skins, ArtCore Gallery, Toronto, Canada
- 2000 Life Goes Well in Pink and Green, Nikolai Fine Art, New York, NY
- 2000 Never The Same After That, The Gallery of South Orange, New Jersey
- 1999 Hartnett-Murray Gallery, New York, NY
