= Margo Consuela Bors =

American artist (born 1942)

- Born: 1942 (age 83–84)
- Education: University of Rochester (BA)

Margo Consuela Bors (born 1942) is an American painter, muralist, photographer and illustrator active in the San Francisco Bay area. She is an activist for protecting native plants and animals is supported by big organizations like the California Native Plant Society.

== Early life and education ==
Bors completed her Bachelor of Arts in 1963, at the University of Rochester, New York. In 1992, she attained her foreign studies degree at the University of Mexico, Mexico City. Later she trained in Asian Art and the Asian Art Museum and in the Native Arts of Africa, Oceana and at the de Young Museum in San Francisco, California. In 1976, Bors began independent studies in fine arts at San Francisco City College.

== Career ==
Bors is a muralist, painter and photographer based in Portero Hill, San Francisco, California. Bors has created murals with Precita eyes muralists and has collaborated with artists Luis and Susan Cervantes and Tony Parrinello. Her aesthetic style is based on her knowledge of the native plants and animals of California. Bors used this knowledge to give a presentation at the San Francisco Botanical Gardens. She has studied and showcased her photography. Bors has given tours of Bayview Hill as well as other national parks. Her photography consists of mostly botanical and native plants and animals primarily from the Bay Area. Bors has illustrated lino prints in the portfolio, Gardening Out Loud, by Judith S. Offer. Bors has contributed 700 Native plant photos to CalPhotos, which is part of the UC digital library.

== Collections ==
Bor's linocut print, California Poppies, was acquired by Library of Congress.

== Bibliography ==
- "Artist Profile." ArtSpan, www.artspan.org/artist/margobors.
- "Featured Artists." The Mission, missionbooksf.com/featured-artists.
- Henkes, Robert. Latin American Women Artists of the United States: The Works of 33 Twentieth-Century Women. Jefferson, N.C: McFarland, 1999.
- Linenthal, Peter, and Abigail Johnston. San Francisco's Potrero Hill. Charleston, SC: Arcadia, 2005. Print.
- Offer, Judith S., and Margo Consuelo. Bors. Gardening out Loud. Pleasant Hill Press, 1998.
- Photographer Margo Bors, calphotos.berkeley.edu/cgi/photographer_query?where-name_full=Margo%2BBors&one=T.
