= Glenda Green =

American painter

- Education: Texas Christian University (TCU); Tulane University
- Known for: Painting

Glenda Allen Green is an American artist, academic, and writer. She has accomplishments in art, art history, science, philosophy, spirituality, and philosophy.

== Life ==
Born in 1945, Glenda Green is a native of Weatherford, Texas. She married art historian and critic Victor Koshkin-Youritzin on August 30, 1970 and together they moved to Norman, Oklahoma in 1972. She was remarried to Brian Bibb in 1980. She married Larry Jensen until his death in 2021.

== Education ==
Glenda pursued her Bachelor of Fine Arts degree in painting at Texas Christian University (TCU). As a student there, she won first place in a national intercollegiate painting competition and graduated magna cum laude with honors in 1967. Continuing her education, Glenda obtained an M.A. in art history from Tulane University in 1970, with her thesis focusing on French Gothic sculpture. During her period as an M.A. student, she held a three-year Kress fellowship, taught art history, and was curator of collections for the Newcomb College art department. She also worked at Fort Worth's Kimbell Art Museum as a research assistant to the institution's director from 1968–1969.

== Career ==
Glenda's painting career as began seriously in 1970 following graduation from her M.A. program. She had established herself as a leading portrait painter and realist by the time she joined the art department at the University of Oklahoma (from 1972-1976) to teach art history and serve as a guest artist on faculty.

Glenda has had her work displayed on exhibition in the United States at the Museum of the Southwest, Midland Texas (1975), Museum of Art, University of Oklahoma, Norman (1975), Oklahoma Museum of Art, Oklahoma City (1976), Philbrook Art Center, Tulsa (1978), the Smithsonian Institution, the Museum of the City of New York, and Williams College Museum of Art. Beginning in 1980, Glenda's prints were published and distributed by Bruce McGaw Graphics of NYC. From 1986–1987, the Oklahoma Art Center in Oklahoma City honored Glenda with a retrospective of her paintings and portraits. In 1998 she had a show at the Mabee-Gerrer Museum of Art. More than 20% of her work is now owned by museums such as the Louvre, the British Museum, the Hermitage, and the Prado.

It was during her creation of an inspired painting of Christ, The Lamb and The Lion, in 1992 that she turned to spiritual writing. Glenda has said that before the fall of 1991, when she was asked to paint a portrait of Jesus Christ, she had not considered the possibility of designating an exclusive spiritual purpose to any of her works.

She is now a public speaker on spirituality and lives in Fort Worth, Texas.

== Works ==
- Love Without End: Jesus Speaks, Spiritis Publishing (1998) ISBN 0-9666623-1-8
- The Keys of Jeshua, Spiritis Publishing (2004) ISBN 0-9666623-7-7
