= Clover Vail =

American artist

- Born: 1939 (age 86–87); Lausanne, Switzerland

Clover Vail (born 1939) is an American artist. Vail received a MacDowell fellowship in 1989. In 2004 Vail received a $25,000 grant from the Adolph and Esther Gottlieb Foundation.

== Collections ==
Her work is included in the collections of the Smithsonian American Art Museum, the Metropolitan Museum of Art and the Cleveland Museum of Art.
