= Barbara Walch =

American ceramist (born 1950)

- Born: 1950; Niagara Falls, New York
- Known for: ceramist
- Website: barbarawalchpottery.com

Barbara Walch (born 1950, Niagara Falls, New York) is an American ceramist known for her hand-built pieces. She attended the State University of New York at New Paltz.

In 1979 she co-founded the studio and store Pinch Pottery in Northampton, Massachusetts. In 1986 she turned her attention to creating ceramics full time. In 1989 Walch relocated to Thorndike, Maine where she established Fire Flower pottery studio.

In 2019 the Maine Potters Market held a retrospective of Walch's work. One of her hand-built tea sets is in the Smithsonian American Art Museum.
