= Kenda North =

American photographer (born 1951)

- Born: 1951 (age 74–75); Chicago, Illinois
- Known for: Photography
- Website: kendanorth.com

Kenda North (born 1951 Chicago) is an American photographer. She attended Colorado College and the Visual Studies Workshop. Her work is included in the collections of the Smithsonian American Art Museum, the Art Institute of Chicago, the Minneapolis Institute of Art and the International Center of Photography.

A native of Chicago, North later became chair of the art department at the University of Texas at Arlington. She was awarded a fellowship from the National Endowment for the Arts in 1997.

In 2017, the Arlington Museum of Art showed a retrospective of North's work titled "Seeing is a Nervous Habit".
