= Mina Carney =

Irish-American sculptor and socialist

- Born: Mina Schoeneman; 1892; Chicago, United States
- Died: 1974 (aged 81–82); London, England
- Known for: Sculpture and political activism

Mina Carney (1892–1974) was an Irish-American sculptor and socialist.

== Life ==
Mina Carney was born Mina Schoeneman in Chicago in 1892. She studied art in Rome and Vienna, and worked in sculptors' studios in Mexico. She studied for a time under Oskar Kokoschka.

Carney met and married the Irish journalist and socialist, Jack Carney, in Chicago in 1917. The couple lived in Duluth, and founded The Truth newspaper together. She was politically active alongside her husband, and they were both deported from the United States as part of the "Palmer raids" after World War I. The couple travelled extensively after their deportation, including to Russia, Vienna, Rome, London, and Dublin, eventually travelling back to the United States.

Her husband was a close friend of Jim Larkin, and Carney served as the secretary of the Larkin defence committee in the early 1920s. When the couple moved to London in the 1930s they lived at Clifford's Inn, Fleet Street, Carney hosted a salon attended by leftist artists and writers including Kokoschka, Sean O'Casey, and Stella Jackson. According to the husband of Carney's niece, Julius H. Kuney, Carney had given up her work as a sculptor by the 1940s. He described her as "an exceedingly bright and very complex woman."

The Hugh Lane Gallery holds four works by Carney, including her portrait bust in bronze of Larkin. Carney donated two of the works herself in 1947, including the bust of Larkin, which was featured in the Golden Jubilee of the Easter Rising exhibition in 1966 at the National Gallery of Ireland.

Carney died in 1974 in London. No more of her sculptures or artwork were among her possessions in her flat in Clifford's Inn, only pictures by Kokoschka.
