= Anne Michalov =

American artist (1904–2001)

- Born: June 6, 1904; Coal City, Illinois, U.S.
- Died: December 29, 2001 (aged 97); Portland, Oregon, U.S.
- Other names: Anne Michalov Johnson
- Known for: Painter, printmaker

Anne (sometimes Ann) Michalov (later Johnson) (June 6, 1904 – December 29, 2001) was an American painter and printmaker.

Michalov was born in Coal City, Illinois and studied at the School of the Art Institute of Chicago in the 1920s. She was involved with the Works Progress Administration during the Great Depression, producing for that entity eleven lithographs as well as paintings and murals. Upon her marriage, Michalov moved to the Pacific Northwest due to her husband's military service. She taught at the WPA Art Center in Spokane, Washington for a time in the 1940s, and briefly lived in Seattle. She died in Portland, Oregon.

Prints by Michalov may be found in the collections of the Smithsonian American Art Museum, the Art Institute of Chicago, the Illinois State Museum, The Newark Museum of Art, and the Dallas Museum of Art. Another lithograph is in the collection of Works Progress Administration art in the art museum at Western Illinois University.

== Gallery ==
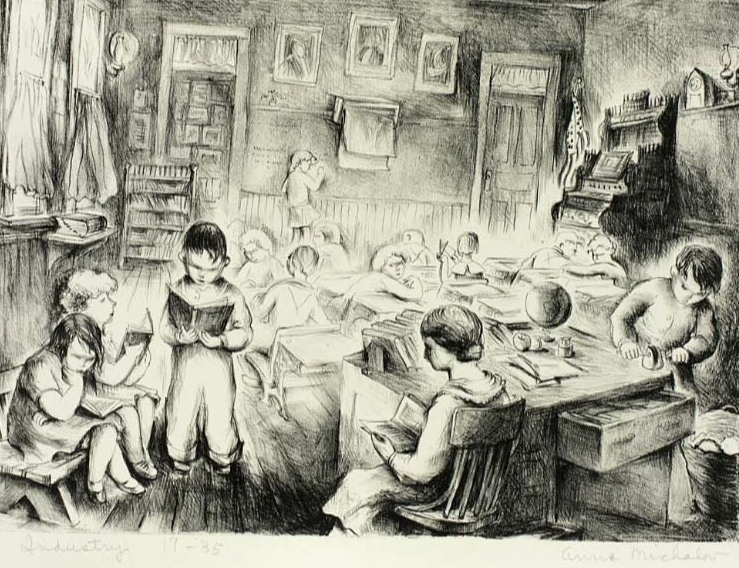
Industry, c. 1935-1942

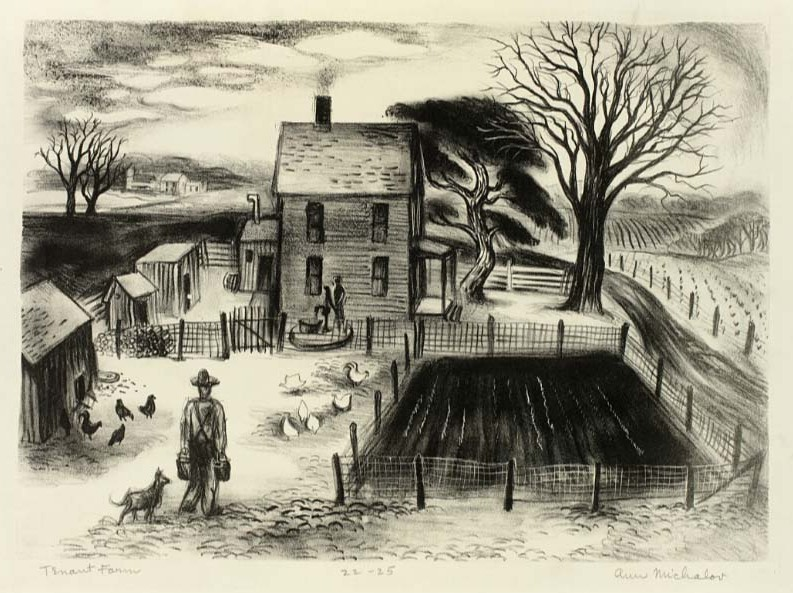
Tenant Farm, c. 1935-1942

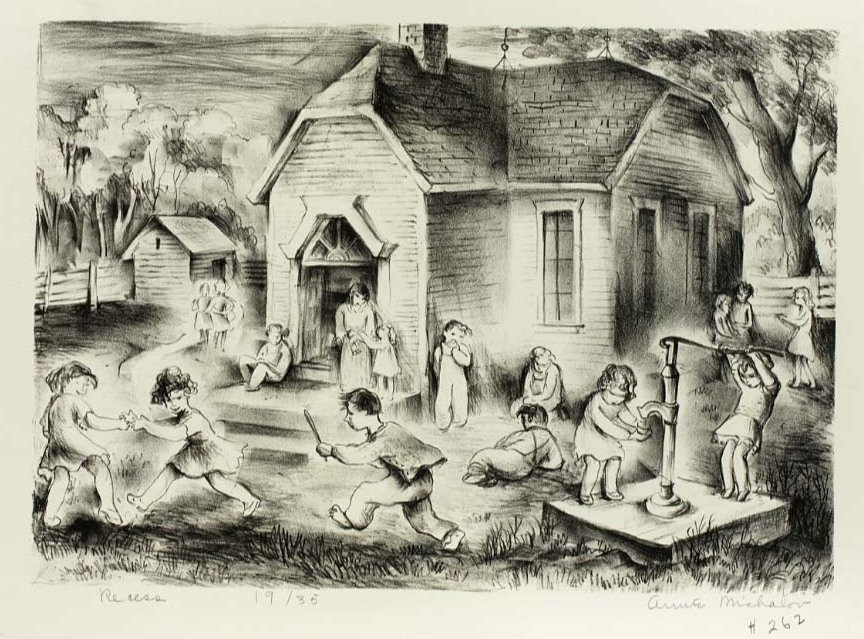
Recess, c. 1935-1942
