= Mildred Waltrip =

American artist and illustrator (1911–2004)

- Born: 1911; Nebo, Kentucky, US
- Died: 2004 (aged 92–93); Tulsa, Oklahoma, US

Mildred Waltrip (1911 – 2004) was an American artist and illustrator.

Waltrip suffered from polio during her lifetime, and wore leg braces. She received her art education at the School of the Art Institute of Chicago.

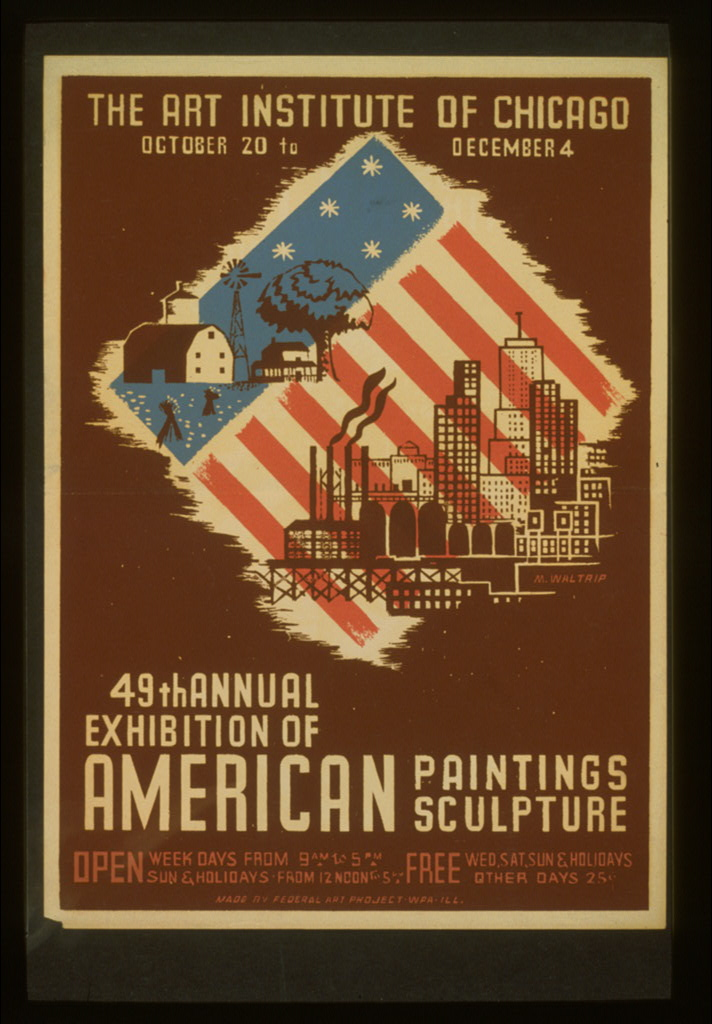
Works Progress Administration commissioned poster by Mildred Waltrip, c. 1936–1938.

Waltrip took part in the Works Progress Administration's art program, completing the murals World Map and People and American Characters in 1938 at the Hatch Elementary School in Oak Park, Chicago. In 1995, the murals were removed, as they portrayed Africans stereotypically, "carrying spears, wearing loincloths and sporting prominent red lips," according to a Chicago Tribune article by Joanne von Alroth. The removed murals were placed in storage.

By the mid 1950s, she was illustrating children's books, including Molecules Today and Tomorrow and Research Adventures for Young Scientists.

== Books illustrated ==
- Your World in Motion: The Story of Energy, 1956
- The First Book of Submarines, 1957
- The Adventure Book of Stars, 1958
- The Science Book of Jets And Rockets, 1961
- Science Projects for Young People, 1964

== Museum collections ==
Her work is included in the collections of the Smithsonian American Art Museum, the Detroit Institute of Arts, the Baltimore Museum of Art, the Art Institute of Chicago, the National Gallery of Art, Washington and the Museum of Modern Art, New York.
