= Aerial art =

Aerial art may refer to:

- Aerial dance
- Aerial silk
- Aerial acrobatics
- Aerobatics, flying maneuvers involving aircraft

== See also ==
- Skywriting
- Fireworks display
- Aerial landscape art
