= Jane Frank =

American painter and sculptor (1918–1986)

- Frank
- Born: Jane Babette Schenthal; July 25, 1918; Baltimore, Maryland, U.S.
- Died: May 31, 1986 (aged 67); Baltimore, Maryland, U.S.
- Education: Maryland Institute College of Art, Parsons School of Design
- Known for: Painting, sculpture
- Style: Abstract expressionism

Jane Schenthal Frank (born Jane Babette Schenthal; July 25, 1918 – May 31, 1986) was an American multidisciplinary artist, known as a painter, sculptor, mixed media artist, illustrator, and textile artist. Her landscape-like, mixed-media abstract paintings are included in public collections, including those of the Corcoran Gallery of Art, the Baltimore Museum of Art, and the Smithsonian American Art Museum. She studied with artists, Hans Hofmann and Norman Carlberg.

== Work ==
Jane Frank was a pupil of the painter, Hans Hofmann. She was an abstract expressionist, who primary drew inspiration from the natural world, particularly landscape. Her later paintings referred more explicitly to aerial landscapes, while her sculpture tended toward minimalism. Chronologically and stylistically, Jane Frank's work straddled the modern, contemporary, and postmodern periods. She referred to her works generally as "inscapes".

== The early years ==
=== Training in commercial art ===
Jane Frank attended the Park School of Baltimore and received her initial artistic training at the Maryland Institute College of Art (then called the Maryland Institute of Arts and Sciences), earning in 1935 a diploma in commercial art and fashion illustration. She then acquired further training in New York City at what is now the Parsons School of Design (then called the New York School of Fine and Applied Art), from which she graduated in 1939. In New York, she also studied at the New Theatre School. Her schooling complete, she began working in advertising design and acting in summer stock theatre. It is unclear whether she worked in these fields while still in New York, or only after returning to Baltimore. She began painting seriously in 1940.

=== Becoming a painter ===
In a letter to Thomas Yoseloff, she wrote that "prior to 1940 my background had been entirely in commercial art" and that when she began painting seriously, she had to "put behind me everything I had so carefully learned in the schools". She began a study of the history of painting and "went through a progression of spatial conceptions" from cave painting through the Renaissance, then concentrating on Cézanne, Picasso, and De Kooning. "I was also much concerned with texture, and heavy paint", she adds.

=== Marriage and family; children's books ===
After returning to Baltimore, she married Herman Benjamin Frank in 1941. Jane had previously been working as a commercial artist "for department stores and advertising agencies", but she "gave up her career in commercial art for marriage and a family". After marrying, she signed her works consistently as "Jane Frank", apparently never including a maiden name or middle initial. Her husband, a builder, constructed their home, including a studio for his wife. Jane Frank returned seriously to painting in 1947.

In the following decade, while raising a family and developing as a painter, Frank also illustrated three children's books. Monica Mink (1948), featured along with Jane Frank's illustrations, a text by the artist herself, entirely in verse. Thomas Yoseloff's The Further Adventures of Till Eulenspiegel (1957, New York City), featured Jane Frank's block prints. She published a third children's book, entitled Eadie the Pink Elephant, with both text and pictures by Frank. .

=== Health ===
In the 20 years after 1947, Jane Frank suffered from illnesses which "interrupted the work for long periods". The first of these health problems was a car accident in 1952, requiring multiple major surgeries and extensive convalescence. The second was a "serious and potentially life-threatening illness" soon after her 1958 solo show at the Baltimore Museum of Art. The latter illness interrupted Jane Frank's painting work for about two years.

== The latter 1950s to late 1960s ==
=== Encountering Hans Hofmann, and discovering a "sculptural landscape" ===
Having recovered from her injuries in the 1952 accident, she studied for a period in 1956 with the abstract expressionist painter Hans Hofmann in Provincetown, Massachusetts. She soon had solo exhibitions at the Baltimore Museum of Art (1958), the Corcoran Gallery of Art (1962), the Bodley Gallery in New York (1963) and Goucher College (1963), among others.

In 1962 (1961 according to some sources), won a Rinehart Fellowship, enabling her to study with Norman Carlberg at the Rinehart School of Sculpture at Maryland Institute College of Art. Works in her 1962 Corcoran show, such as "Crags and Crevices" and "Rockscape II", featured sculptural paintings with thick mounds of gesso.

=== Combining diverse materials and techniques ===
Soon after the month-long Corcoran Gallery solo exhibition, Jane Frank began to apply variety of other materials – sea-weathered or broken glass, charred driftwood, pebbles, crushed graphite or silica, and glued-on patches of separately painted and encrusted canvas (canvas collage) – to her abstract expressionist paintings. Jane Frank's first solo show at New York City's Bodley Gallery (1963), as well as her 1965 solo show at Baltimore's International Gallery, featured many of these mixed media paintings.

=== "Apertured", multiple-canvas paintings ===
Later she began making irregular holes in the canvases ("apertures", as she called them: the earliest example is "Winter Windows", 1966–1967), disclosing deeper layers of painted canvas underneath (so-called "double canvases" – and sometimes triple canvases), with painted-on "false shadows", etc. – increasingly invoking the third dimension, creating tactile, sculptural effects while remaining within the convention of the framed, rectangular oil painting. The apertures also suggest a view into some sort of psychological interior, as though the second canvas – seen only partially, through the hole in the forward canvas – were some half-concealed secret, perhaps even another whole painting that we will never see.

Stanton (p. 24) also notes that Jane Frank worked out a method – unspecified – of stiffening the apertures' often jagged edges so that they held their shape and flatness. These creations are a type of "shaped canvas", though very different from the shaped canvases of Frank Stella and others more commonly associated with this term.

In much of her output before the late 1960s, Frank often employed the grayscale to create a sense of depth or motion from light to dark, this frequently moving in a diagonal (as in "Winter's End", 1958), and otherwise employing one basic hue (as with the earthy reds in "Plum Point", 1964). However, the later, "windowed" paintings use bolder colors.

..."Winter Windows" is perhaps sublime in Burke's use of the word for a kind of beauty which produces sensations of awe and helplessness.... Part of the power of these pictures is the result of their controlled design, for balance, color, texture, have been managed so economically that the least change would throw the whole out of key.

– Phoebe Stanton [The Sculptural Landscape of Jane Frank (1968), p. 29]

== After 1967: sculptures, and further development of the "apertured" paintings ==
=== Sculpture: depths and shadows, reflections and refractions ===
In the late 1960s, Jane Frank turned her energies toward the creation of free-standing sculpture, as opposed to "sculptural paintings" or mixed media works on canvas.

Frank had more solo exhibitions, at venues including New York City's Bodley Gallery again in 1967, Morgan State University (1967), Goucher College (for the second time) in 1968, London's Alwin Gallery in 1971, the Galerie de l'Université, Paris (1972), the Philadelphia Art Alliance (1975), and a major retrospective at Towson State College (now Towson University) in 1975. She also won the Sculpture Prize at the 1983 Maryland Artists Exhibition.

=== Aerial landscape paintings ===
Aafter 1967, when Jane Frank began making sculptures, with new media such as plastics and metals, continued to make mixed media paintings on canvas, virtually until the end of her life. Continuing her style of multiple-canvas, "apertured" paintings, she began to create her "Aerial Series" pieces, which came more explicitly suggested landscapes seen from above.

Jane Frank also designed rugs and tapestries.

Jane Frank died on Saturday, May 31, 1986 in Owings Mills, Maryland.

== Discussion of Jane Frank's work ==
Phoebe Stanton writes that "landscape" is for Jane Frank a way of conveying ideas which (to Stanton) recall Heidegger's definition of poetry, which included "the recreation of the experience of standing 'in the presence of the gods and to be exposed to the essential proximity of things' ". According to the jacket notes of the Stanton book, Pictures on Exhibit magazine commented in a similar vein, saying that these landscapes are "to a compellingly strong degree, poetic evocations of communion with Nature's basic essentials". We are in direct contact with the primal forces, exposed and profoundly alone.

These works are at once sensually compelling and incorporeal – "out-of-body", so to speak. And as Julia M. Busch points out, even the sculptures avoid reference to anything recognizably, bodily human. Stating that Frank's sculptures are "environmental", Busch goes on to define this term in a way that points to their "beyond-human" quality:

"Environmental sculpture is never made to work at exactly human scale, but is sufficiently larger or smaller than the scale to avoid confusion with the human image in the eyes of the viewer."

Also, the canvases of the 1960s, for all their landscape-like qualities, usually avoid anything that can be read as a horizon or a sky: we literally don't know which way is up; for as Stanton (p. 12) points out, Jane Frank – starting with "Winter's End" (1958) – avoids horizontal orientation in favor of strong diagonals. Furthermore, in this painting, as in many others of the next decade, the scale is undecidable. Stanton, again speaking of "Winter's End", writes:

"One is given no indication of the size of the scene; the way through which winter passes could be either a mountain gorge or a minute water course".

Plenty of cues are there that this is some sort of landscape, and Frank herself avows it:

"The beginning of my efforts to make my own statement, I would trace to my first visit to the Phillips Gallery.... Landscape was a natural metaphor, and so it is still for me today, in my three-dimensional double canvases".

Summing up the ambiguous position of Jane Frank's work on canvas with respect to both landscape art and pure abstraction, a reviewer for The Art Gallery magazine wrote of her 1971 solo show at London's Alwin Gallery: "Her richly textured canvases evoke a world of crags and forests, rivers and plains, in terms which are entirely non-representational."

An art catalogue contains a long essay by the artist, described here:

I prefer to create my own landscapes or vocabulary of shapes and patterns. However, it is rock and mineral substances, their veins and surfaces, projections and infinite hollows, which spark my particular fantasy – also beach wood, well worn with time, that is to be found on the water's edge. Issues of space have always been one of my prime concerns, and these substances seem to relate most closely to this concern. These then are the metaphor...

These pieces of the late 1950s and 1960s never lapse into the complaisantly decorative: there is a certain deliberate instability, often even violence, that prevents that. This quality comes through in another remark from Stanton's book. She's speaking of "Crags and Crevices", but it fits many of the works: "Nothing in the painting is still, for the big forms seem to hover in mid-air, colliding as they fall. There are provocative and startling contrasts between passages of thin, transparent paint and thick impasto, filled with striatures left by the palette knife."

Even 1968's "Aerial View No. 1", despite the spatial hint of the title, is far from literal. Certain features of structure and color render a literal interpretation of this image as an aerial landscape difficult or even impossible. The attempt at interpretation is both invited and repulsed. But by about 1970, with the "Night Landings" paintings, there was a definite shift away from the previous decade's stubbornly refractive attitude. The "Night Landings" offer a much more definite sense of scale and viewpoint, especially with the aid of the titles. "Night Landings: Nairobi" is not disorienting in the least: we know where we are; we know we're in a plane, we know the plane is landing, and we even know roughly what time it is: we are looking down, and we see vividly the city named in the title, with the surrounding land and water.

Furthermore, the fact that we see a city down there means that – at least implicitly – there are people in this painting.

Yoseloff, in his 1975 "Retrospective" book, enthuses:

"Perhaps the ultimate achievement in the direction in which Mrs. Frank has been tending is her series of "night landings".... Now, more than ever, the viewer is deeply involved, and he can feel himself carried downward into the landscape that is the canvas before him"

A staunch modernist might scoff that with the "Night Landings" of 1970 Jane Frank's art begins to "go gentle into that good night" (perhaps even lapsing into "postmodernism"). But if these more literal aerial landscapes – created in 1970 and after – lose some of the tension that gives the earlier paintings their distinctive power, they nevertheless address, with an intensely intimate delight, a perspective on reality which we must remember was still quite young in 1970, at least as a painterly subject. In "Aerial Perception" (1985), author Margret Dreikausen sees Jane Frank's aerial landscapes as sharing the spirit of the work of artists such as Georgia O'Keeffe, Susan Crile, and others, in creating images which "reflect contemporary interest in reality", experienced from a historically new vantage point. Dreikausen insists that this art "does not merely show landscape from the air" but incorporates the "earthbound vision" into "remembered images from both spaces". Dreikausen also sees Frank's aerial paintings as consisting of two basic types: the "day scenes" (such as "Ledge of Light") and the "night landings" (such as "Night Landing: Sambura"). The day scenes show a fascination with the play of actual shadows and false, painted ones, "inviting the viewer more closely to inspect the textures on the canvas and its 'reality' ". In the night landings, by contrast, the city is the focus, nestled in the canvas's aperture, like a precious jewel in a dark velvet box, with its "enticing twinkling lights", suggesting "the anticipation of the unknown, mysterious city.... The use of beads and glitter, partially covered with paint, conveys a sense of personal landscape".

The 1999 Benezit book's entry on Jane Frank takes it as a given that her works on the canvas may be summarized as semi-abstract aerial views: "Sa peinture, abstraite, fait cependant reference a un paysagisme aerien, comme vu d'avion." ("Her paintings, though abstract, nevertheless make reference to aerial landscapes, as viewed from an airplane.")

== Collections ==
Jane Frank's paintings and mixed media works on canvas are in the collections of the Corcoran Gallery of Art ("Amber Ambience", 1964), the Smithsonian American Art Museum, the Baltimore Museum of Art ("Winter's End", 1958), the Herbert F. Johnson Museum of Art at Cornell University ("Red Painting", 1966), the Arkansas Arts Center in Little Rock ("Web Of Rock", 1960), and the Evansville Museum ("Quarry III", 1963). Her works are in many other public, academic, corporate, and private collections.

Her sculptures can be found in public collections including at Towson State University.

Public art collections
Year	Title	Media	Location	Notes
1958	Winter's End		Baltimore Museum of Art	
1960	Web of Rock	mixed media on canvas	Arkansas Arts Center	
1961	Crags and Crevices	mixed media on canvas		
1963	Quarry III		Evansville Museum	
1964	Amber Ambience	painting	Corcoran Gallery of Art	
1966	Red Painting	mixed media on canvas	Herbert F. Johnson Museum of Art at Cornell University	
1968	Frazer's Hog Cay #18	mixed media on canvas	Smithsonian American Art Museum	
1975	Allar	aluminum sculpture	Towson State University	
