= Charles Harold Davis =

American landscape painter (1856–1933)

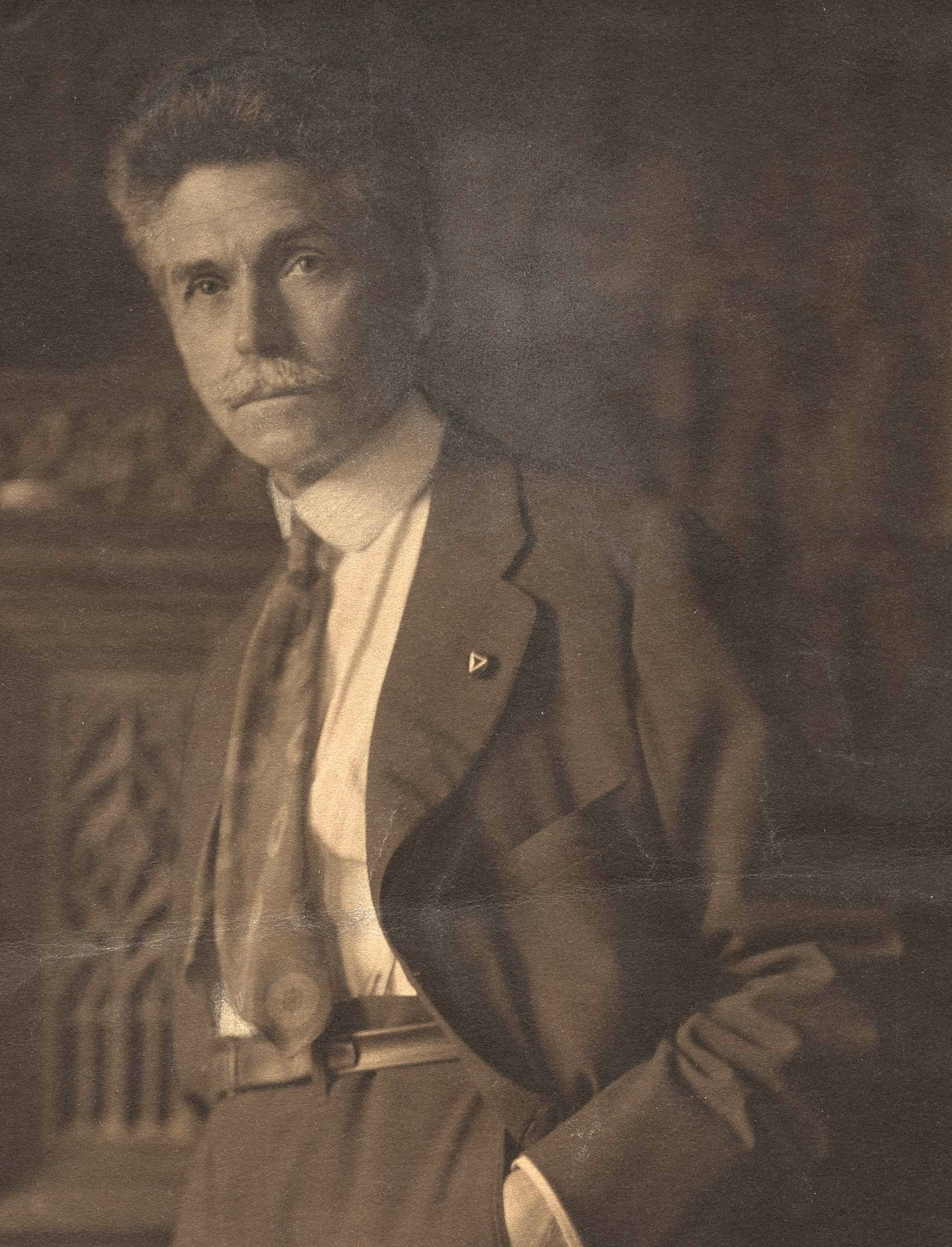
- circa 1914
- Born: January 7, 1856; Amesbury, Massachusetts, United States
- Died: August 5, 1933 (aged 77)
- Known for: Landscape art, Painting

Charles Harold Davis (7 January 1856 – 5 August 1933) was an American landscape painter.

== Biography ==
He was born at Amesbury, Massachusetts. A pupil of the schools of the Boston Museum of Fine Arts, he was sent to Paris in 1880. Having studied at the Académie Julian under Jules Joseph Lefebvre and Gustave Boulanger, he went to Barbizon and painted much in the forest of Fontainebleau under the traditions of the men of thirty.

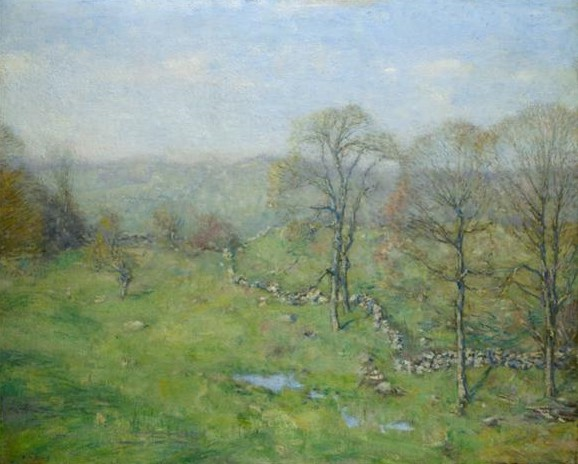
"May Morning", a painting by Davis

In 1890, Davis returned to the U.S., settling in Mystic, Connecticut. He shifted to Impressionism in his style, and took up the cloudscapes for which he became best-known.

He became a full member of the National Academy of Design in 1906, and received many awards, including a silver medal at the Paris Exhibition of 1889.

He is represented by important works in the Metropolitan Museum of Art, New York; the Corcoran Gallery of Art, Washington; the Pennsylvania Academy, Philadelphia, and the Boston Museum of Fine Arts.

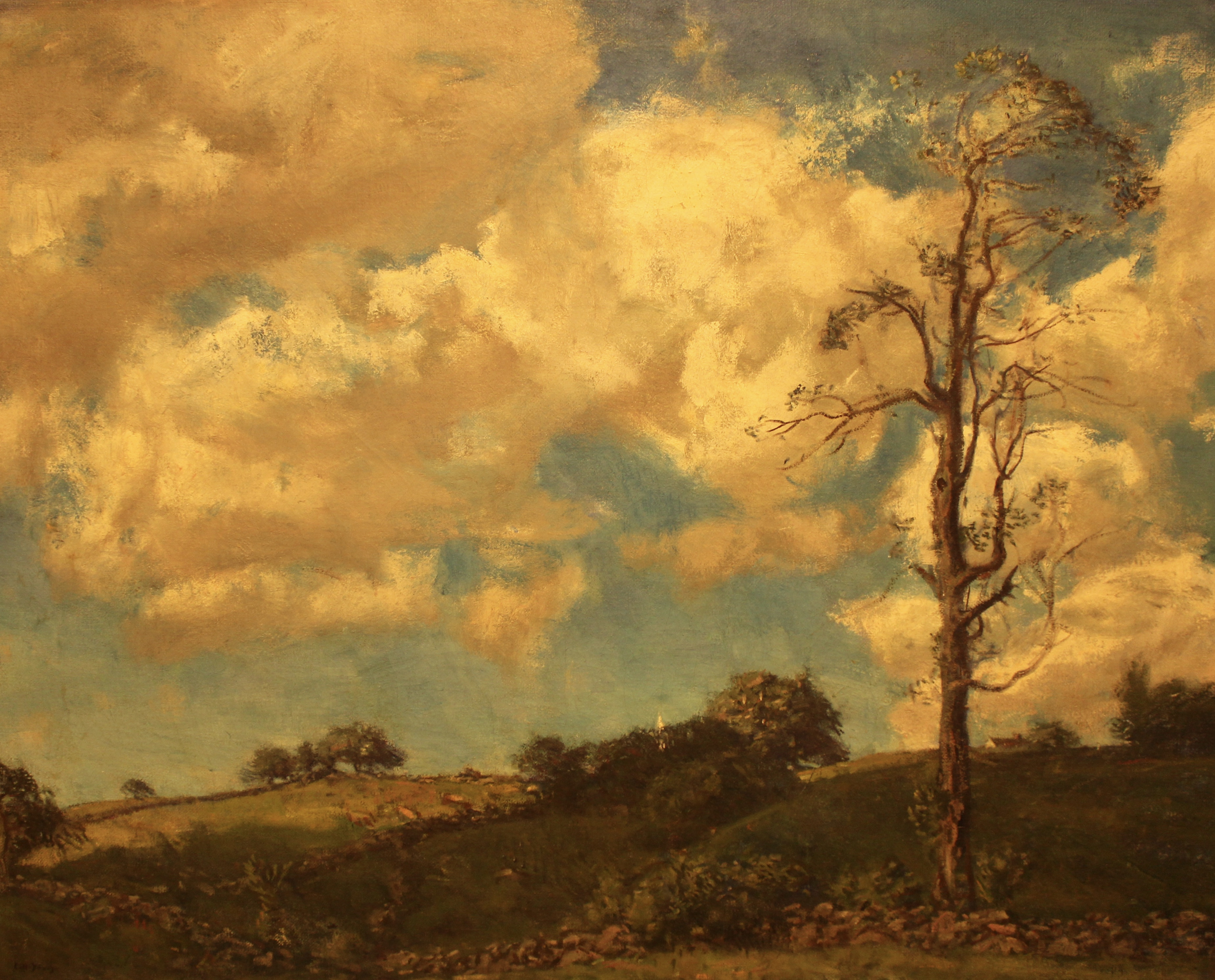
Summer Clouds
