= Martha Goodway =

American metallurgist

- Born: Roslindale, Massachusetts, U.S.
- Education: Massachusetts Institute of Technology (BS)
- Years active: 1960s–2000s
- Known for: First full-time museum metallurgist in the U.S. - Expert in historical harpsichord metallurgy
- Notable work: Metals Used in Harpsichords (1987)
- Title: Archaeometallurgist Emeritus, Smithsonian Museum Conservation Institute
- Scientific career
- Fields: Metallurgy, Archaeometallurgy, Conservation Science
- Workplaces: Smithsonian Institution

Martha Goodway is an American metallurgist, specializing in archaeometallurgy, the study of traditional techniques of mining, smelting, and working metals; and an expert in the use of metals in historical harpsichords.

== Early life and education ==
Martha Goodway was raised in Roslindale, Massachusetts. She came from a family of engineers. She graduated from Roslindale High School in 1952, and earned a bachelor's degree in general engineering at the Massachusetts Institute of Technology in 1957. She was one of only nineteen women to earn degrees at MIT that year.

== Career ==
After college she became interested in conservation science, and studied with William Young at the Objects Conservation and Scientific Research Laboratory in Boston. Through Young's connections, she became a metallurgist at the Conservation Analytical Laboratory of the Smithsonian Institution. She became the first metallurgist to work full time in a U.S museum. She worked there for 41 years. In that job, she worked on such diverse historical artifacts as waterproof Greek vessels, Etruscan mirrors, 18th-century wire jewelry from Germany, and the crankcase of the Wright Brothers' first flyer. She was also consulted for comments on the restoration of the Statue of Liberty.

She developed an interest in the use of metals in historical musical instruments, particularly the harpsichord, and co-authored a book on the subject in 1987.

Goodway currently holds the title Archaeometallurgist Emeritus at the Smithsonian's Museum Conservation Institute.
