= Cloudscape photography =

Photography of clouds or sky

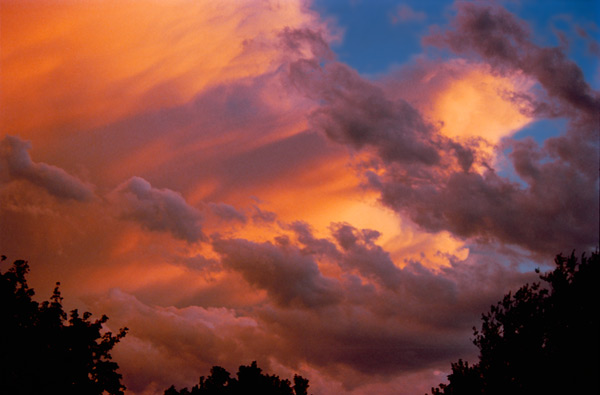
Colourful clouds

Cloudscape photography is photography of clouds or sky.

An early cloudscape photographer, Belgian photographer Léonard Misonne (1870–1943), was noted for his black and white photographs of heavy skies and dark clouds.

In the early to middle 20th century, American photographer Alfred Stieglitz (1864–1946) created a series of photographs of clouds, called "equivalents" (1925–1931). According to an essay on the series at the Phillips Collection website, "A symbolist aesthetic underlies these images, which became increasingly abstract equivalents of his own experiences, thoughts, and emotions". More recently, photographers such as Ralph Steiner, Robert Davies and Tzeli Hadjidimitriou have been noted for producing such images.

== See also ==
- Aerial landscape art
- Cloud Appreciation Society
- Cloudscape (art)
- Landscape

== Sources and readings ==
- Davies, Robert; Christopher Bucklow; "Cloudscapes"; Lisbon (Portugal). Arquivo Fotográfico Municipal. (Lisboa, Portugal: Câmara Municipal, Cultura: Arquivo fotográfico, 1997) ISBN 972-97226-2-5 [Worldcat subject headings include "Davies, Robert" and "Photography of clouds"]
- Steiner, Ralph. Smith College. "In pursuit of clouds : images and metaphors"; Museum of Art. (Albuquerque, N.M.: Distributed by the University of New Mexico Press, ©1985) ISBN 0-9615132-0-9 [Photography of clouds]
- Hadjidimitriou, Tzeli. Time fading into clouds | O χρόνος χάθηκε στα σύννεφα. Texts from: N. Vatopoulos, N. Chronas, Tz. Hadjidimitriou, Metaichmio, 2003, ISBN 960-375-634-2
- Eastman Museum, Gathering Clouds: Photographs from the Nineteenth Century and Today, an exhibition held from 26 July 2020 to 3 January 2021.
