= Skyscape art =

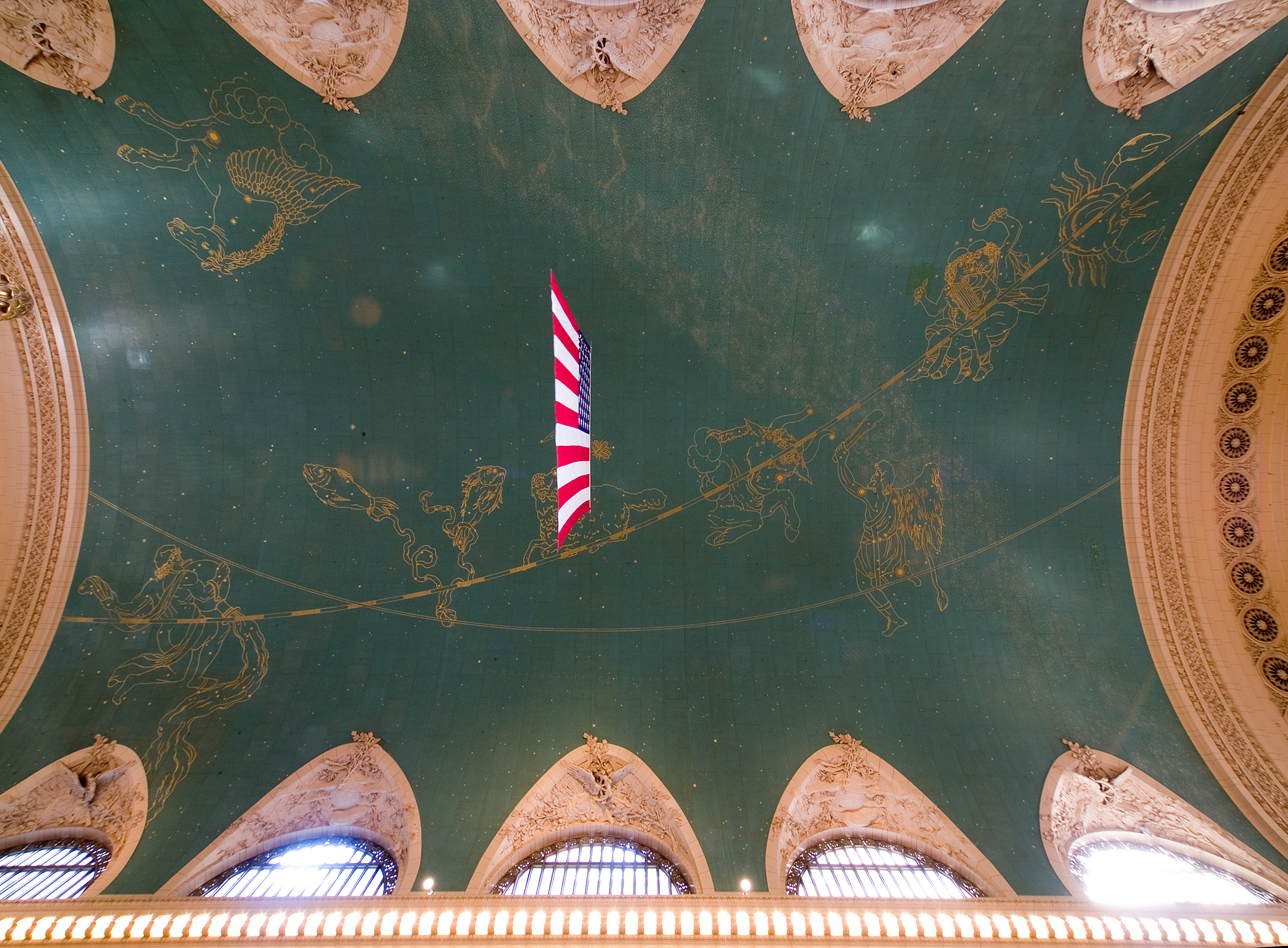
The constellation mural at Grand Central Terminal in New York City is an example of skyscape art.

Skyscape art depicts representations of the sky, especially in a painting or photograph. Skyscapes differ from cloudscapes because they do not necessarily include clouds. Like cloudscape art, skyscape art can also omit any view of land or anything else which might help to suggest scale or orientation. Images called "skyscapes" often do include clouds or land, but these things can also be excluded or kept to a minimum.

== Appearance ==
The view may be from Earth or from a level far above. There is often nothing to suggest scale in the art, unless a bit of landscape is included or some phenomena such as the depiction of clouds, precipitation, rainbows and aurorae. Some artists also depict birds, insects and other flying objects, as well as manmade aircraft, kites and objects such as leaves, and balloons.

There are many examples of cloudless skies in painting, printmaking, serigraphy and photography.

Weather is often an important element in the composition of skyscapes.

The sky is the denser gaseous zone of the Earth’s atmosphere. Sky can be depicted as many different colors, such as a pale blue or the lack of any color at all, such as the night sky, which has the appearance of blackness, albeit with a scattering of stars on a clear night. During the day, the sky is seen as a deep blue due to the sunlight reflected on the air.

Astronomically speaking, the sky is a celestial sphere–an imaginary dome divided into constellations–where the Moon, planets, stars and Sun seem to visually move across the sky.

== Examples ==
In the 1950s, Eric Sloane painted many cloudless skyscapes during his stay in Taos, New Mexico.

Another example of a cloudless skyscape artwork is the celestial ceiling mural at Grand Central Terminal in New York City.
