= Roslindale Substation =

- U.S. National Register of Historic Places
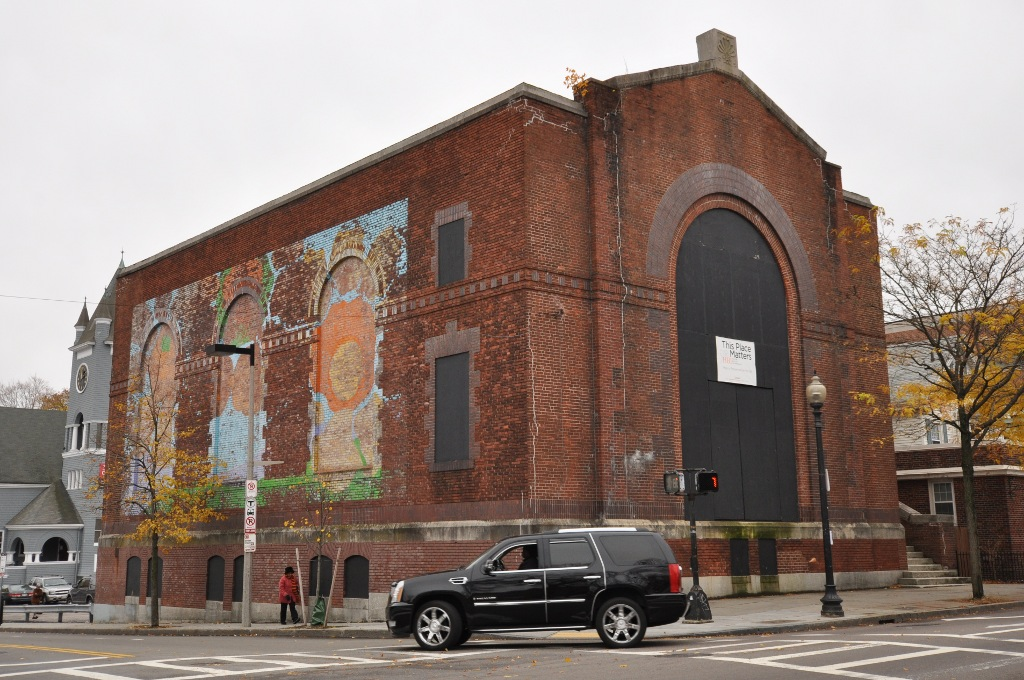

- Location within Massachusetts Location within the United States
- Location: 4228 Washington Street, Roslindale, Boston, Massachusetts
- Coordinates: 42°17′11″N 71°7′41″W
- Built: 1911
- Architectural style: Classical Revival
- Website: https://thesubstation.space/
- NRHP reference No.: 13000621
- Added to NRHP: August 27, 2013

The Roslindale Substation is a historic electrical substation building at 4228 Washington Street in the center of the Roslindale village of Boston, Massachusetts. The brick Classical Revival building was constructed in 1911 by the Boston Elevated Railway (BERy), a predecessor to today's MBTA. The monumental building is 80 feet (24 m) long, 50 feet (15 m) wide, and 46 feet (14 m) high. The building was designed by Robert S. Peabody of Peabody and Stearns, and built by Stone & Webster. The building was use by the Boston Elevated and its successors to provide AC to DC conversion for street cars until 1971. It is one of four (out of seven originally built) substations built by the BERy to survive.

The building was listed on the National Register of Historic Places in 2013.

== Renovation and current use ==
The building was vacant from 1971 until 2013, when the City of Boston sold it to two local non-profit groups, Historic Boston Incorporated and Roslindale Village Main Street, a former affiliate of the National Trust for Historic Preservation Main Streets program. The non-profits purchased an adjacent parcel of land, and entered into an agreement with a private developer, the Peregrine Group, who would build apartments on the adjacent parcel and restore the substation building. Temporary use of the renovated substation began in 2017, and a long-term tenant, the Turtle Swamp Beer Garden, was in operation from 2019 to 2021. Workhub at the Substation, a co-working space, began operations in the basement of the building. After the beer garden announced its closing, Workhub revealed plans to take over the ground floor space.

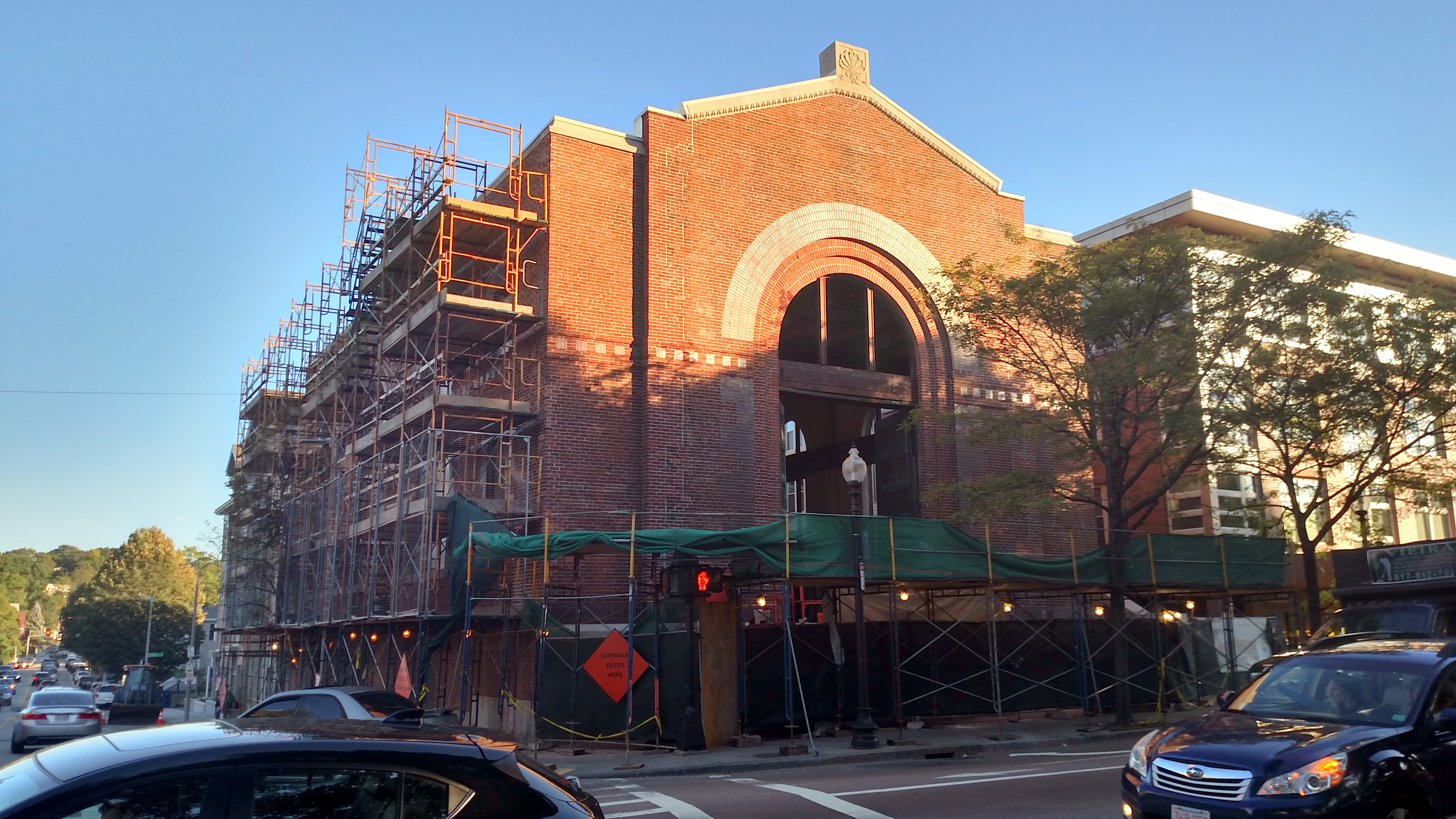
The substation being renovated in 2016. The new apartment building is at right.

In spring 2022, the ground floor was again turned into a beer hall run by a rotating selection of local breweries.

== See also ==
- Egleston Substation
- National Register of Historic Places listings in southern Boston, Massachusetts
