= Roslindale =

Coordinates: 42.286°N 71.129°W

- Neighborhood of Boston
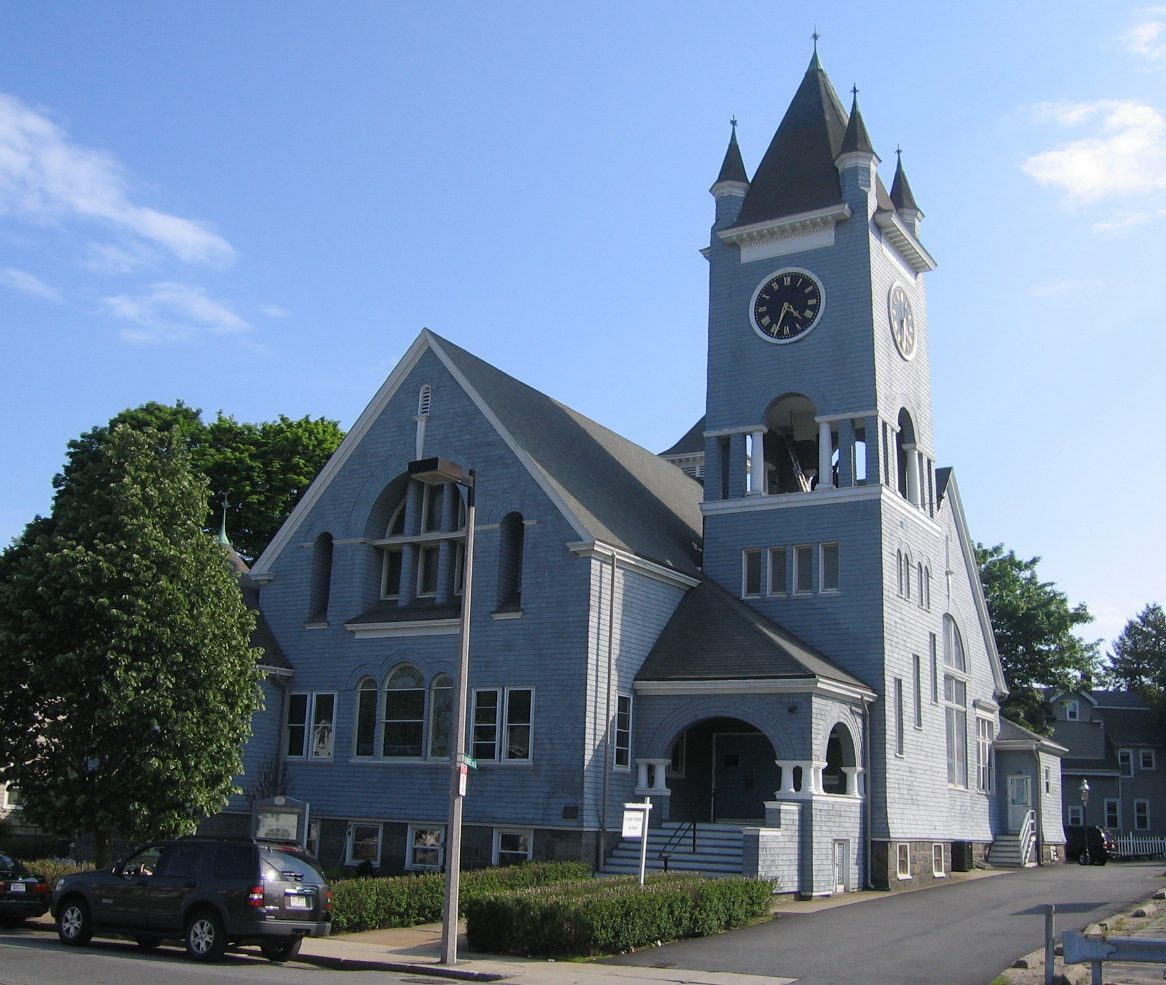
- Roslindale Congregational Church
- Nicknames: Rozzi, Rozzie Rossi (alternate spellings)
- Interactive map of Roslindale
- Country: United States
- State: Massachusetts
- County: Suffolk
- Neighborhood of: Boston
- Annexed by Boston: Sep 16 1873
- Time zone: UTC-5 (Eastern)
- Zip Code: 02131
- Area code: 617 / 857

Roslindale is a primarily residential neighborhood of Boston, Massachusetts, United States, bordered by Jamaica Plain, Hyde Park, West Roxbury and Mattapan. It is served by an MBTA Commuter Rail line, several MBTA bus lines and the MBTA Orange Line in nearby Jamaica Plain. Roslindale has its own branch of the Boston Public Library, the neighborhood is covered by Boston Police District E-5 in West Roxbury, Boston EMS Ambulance 17 is stationed in Roslindale, and the Boston Fire Department has a station on Canterbury Street which houses Ladder 16, Engine 53 & District Chief 12. Roslindale's original Engine Company 45 was deactivated on April 10, 1981, due to budget cuts. Roslindale was once called the "garden suburb" of Boston. The portion of the Arnold Arboretum south of Bussey Street is located in Roslindale.

Six miles south-southwest of downtown Boston, Roslindale was originally part of the town of Roxbury. In 1851, current day Jamaica Plain, Roslindale and West Roxbury seceded from Roxbury. The area voted in 1873 to be annexed to the City of Boston.

== History ==
In the 1860s, the area was called South Street Crossing, due to the railroad's intersection with South Street. However, when the community applied for a post office district of its own, the name "South Street Crossing" proved to be unacceptable to the government. The name Roslindale was suggested by John Pierce, a well-traveled member of the community, who told the assembled citizens that the area reminded him of the historic town of Roslin, Scotland, outside Edinburgh. Pierce thought the area was like a dale because of the hills surrounding it. Thus the combination of "Roslin" and "dale" was submitted to the United States Postal Service and the name Roslindale was formally established.

Roslindale grew residentially as a classic streetcar suburb. The railway was built after the American Civil War, and spawned a new round of commercial development. Roslindale saw steady growth in its residential population, beginning in the 1880s, with the introduction of the horse-drawn street railway service between Forest Hills and Dedham.

The Forest Hills disaster, a train wreck, occurred in Roslindale on March 14, 1887. A Boston & Providence Railroad train consisting of a locomotive and nine passenger cars inbound from Dedham to Boston with over 200 passengers, was passing over a bridge at Bussey Street, in the current Arnold Arboretum, when the bridge collapsed causing the rear five cars to pile up on top of each other, killing twenty-three and injuring over one hundred. This is considered one of the first major rail catastrophes in the country, and contributed to the widespread inspection of train bridges across the U.S.

In the 1920s, Roslindale Square assumed the configuration it has today, with tree-lined Adams Park at its center. Roslindale falls in a crease between several other Boston neighborhoods and the parts of Roslindale adjacent to these surrounding neighborhoods take on the characteristics of those neighborhoods. For example, the western part of Roslindale blends seamlessly with West Roxbury's one and two family residences and tree lined streets; and Roslindale's northern area consists of dense two and three family residences amidst light industrial buildings similar to the adjacent Stony Brook corridor in Jamaica Plain.

On March 1, 1929, more than 5,000 people turned out to see Ashland Street renamed Cummins Highway in honor of Fr. John Cummins, the first pastor of Sacred Heart Church. (Note: Cummins was born in Charlestown on September 17, 1852. He attended Boston College and the College of the Holy Cross before St. Joseph's Provincial Seminary in Troy, New York. He was ordained on December 18, 1875 and was named pastor of Sacred Heart at its establishment on July 7, 1893. He died on March 20, 1933.) The road had been widened to between 60' and 80', and ran from Washington Street in Roslindale to River Street in Mattapan at a cost of $750,000. At the dedication ceremony, Mayor Malcolm Nichols handed Cummins the quill used to sign the name change into effect and Cummins then blessed the road and all who traveled on it. It was the first road in Boston to be called a highway and one of only a few to be named for a person still living.

Prior to the rise of suburban shopping malls in the 1970s, the Roslindale business district, Roslindale Square, was a major shopping district for the city of Boston, with department stores, showrooms, food markets, and a movie theatre. After suffering years of vacant storefronts and increased vandalism during the 1970s, 1980s and 1990s. Roslindale Square enjoys a renewed success today as a local shopping district, which includes the restored Roslindale Substation and the rising number of new apartment buildings. Additionally, since the 1980s, the Roslindale Village Main Street has enjoyed success in creating a community in Roslindale Square, running several events including the Roslindale Farmers' Market and the annual tree lighting in Adams Park.

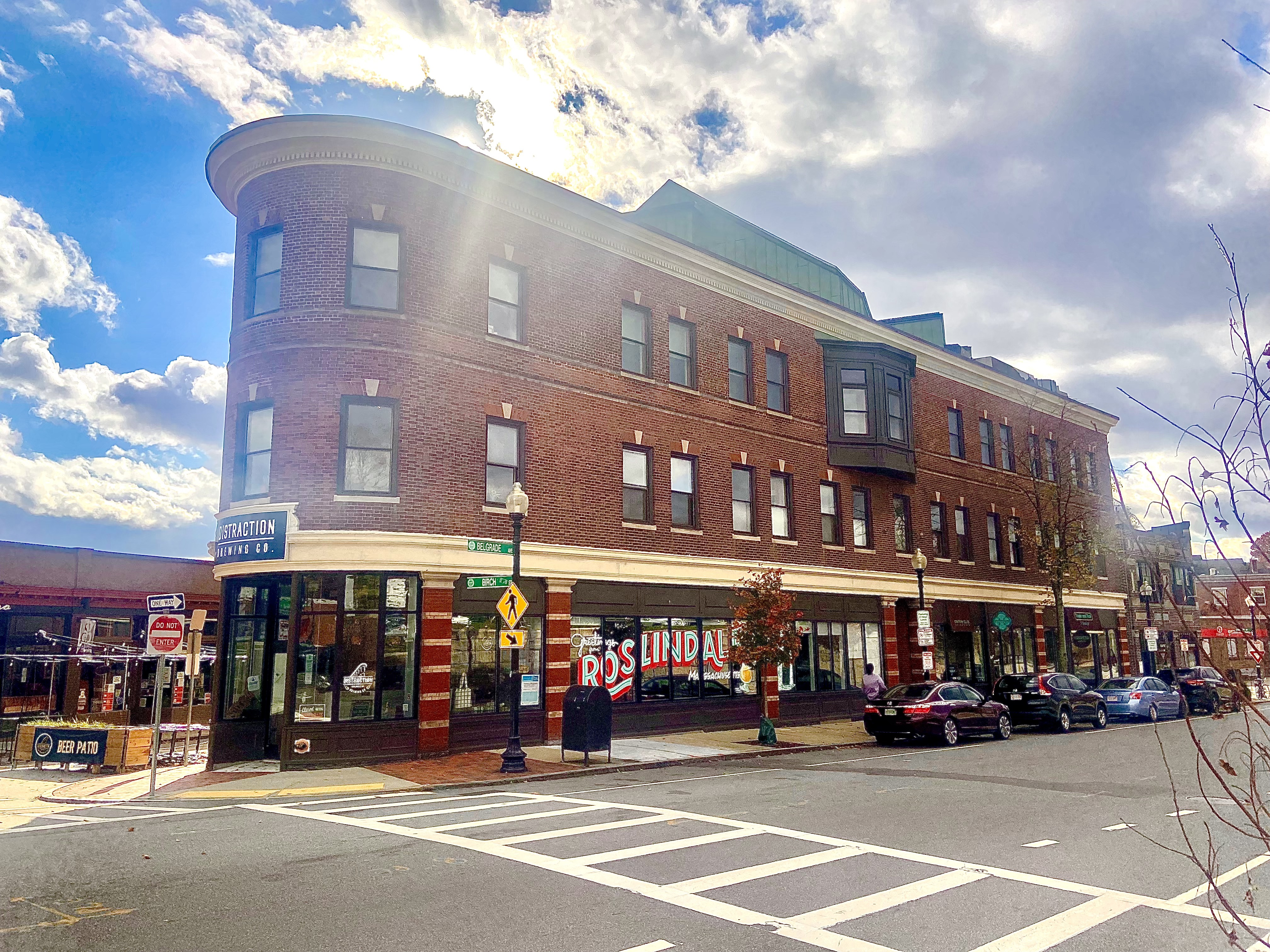
A portion of Roslindale Square on Belgrade Ave., directly across the street from the Roslindale Village Commuter Rail stop.

== Demographics ==
Roslindale is a diverse neighborhood—according to the 2020 census, the racial makeup of its inhabitants was 45.7% Non-Hispanic White, 20.6% Non-Hispanic Black or African-American, 25.1% Hispanic or Latino, 3.5% Asian or Pacific Islander, and 5.2% identified as other or multiple races.

== Notable people ==
- Joseph Abboud
- Paul Francis Anderson
- Mark Bavis
- Martha Cahoon
- Steve DeOssie, linebacker for Boston College and four NFL teams
- Stephen Davenport
- Walter Alden Dyer
- George Fair
- Charlotte Gilbertson
- Martha Goodway
- T. Vincent Learson
- Skip Lockwood
- Brian McGrory
- Mary McGrory
- Matt O'Malley
- Charlie Rugg
- Slaine
- Esoteric
- Paul Sally
- Stephen Soldz
- Marian Walsh
- Billy West
- Courtney Sims
- Michelle Wu, Mayor of Boston, Massachusetts

== Education ==
=== Elementary schools ===
- Sacred Heart School
- George H Conley
- Sarah Roberts
- Mozart
- Phineas Bates
- Dennis C Haley
- Charles Sumner
- Children's Learning Center
- Brooke Charter School

=== Middle schools ===
- Sacred Heart School
- Brooke Charter School
- Washington Irving Middle School

=== High schools ===
- St. Clare High School [closed - building is now Brooke Charter School]

== In popular culture ==
- Roslindale is depicted in the 2017 film, Last Night in Rozzie

== See also ==
- District 5, Boston
