= Sky Above Clouds =

Painting series by Georgia O'Keeffe

Sky Above Clouds series
- Sky above Clouds IV (1965; 8 ft. by 24 ft.): The largest painting O'Keeffe ever produced (Art Institute of Chicago).
- Housed at: National Gallery of Art (1); Georgia O'Keeffe Museum (6); Art Institute of Chicago (1); Private collection (3)
- Size (no. of items): 11

Sky Above Clouds (1960–1977) is a series of eleven cloudscape paintings by the American modernist painter Georgia O'Keeffe, produced during her late period. The series of paintings is inspired by O'Keeffe's views from her airplane window during her frequent air travel in the 1950s and early 1960s when she flew around the world. The series begins in 1960 with Sky Above the Flat White Cloud II, the start of a minimalist cycle of six works, with O'Keeffe trying to replicate the view of a solid white cloud she saw while flying back to New Mexico. She would continue to work on this singular motif in Sky with Flat White Cloud, Clouds 5/ Yellow Horizon and Clouds, Sky with Moon, and Sky Above Clouds / Yellow Horizon and Clouds. A darker variation of this motif occurred in 1972, influenced by her battle with macular degeneration, resulting in The Beyond, her last, unassisted painting before losing her eyesight.

In 1962, O'Keeffe experimented with a representational cycle in the series based on a different view she saw while flying, this time of a pink sky above the horizon with patches of cloudlets, or cloud streets below it, rather than a solid mass of clouds. Her first attempt at trying to replicate this view, An Island with Clouds, was unsuccessful, but she began to make significant progress on this theme in 1963 with Above the Clouds I. The momentum carried her through two more variations on the same idea, Sky Above Clouds II and Sky Above Clouds III, with both works twice the size of the first. The final, fourth work in this cycle, Sky Above Clouds IV, is the largest painting ever created by the artist, at two meters (eight feet) high and seven meters (24 feet) wide. O'Keeffe completed this monumental work at the age of 77 in the summer of 1965. Three of the paintings in the series are held by private collectors, while the rest are found in the National Gallery of Art, the Georgia O'Keeffe Museum, and the Art Institute of Chicago.

== Background ==
Georgia O'Keeffe (1887–1986) spent her early career as an artist in New York from 1918 through 1929. By the late 1930s, she had become the most famous woman painter in the United States. She married art dealer and photographer Alfred Stieglitz in 1924. His series of cloud photographs, known as the Equivalents (1925–1934), shows that O'Keeffe and her husband addressed similar subjects, but had different approaches. "More difficult to assess is the extent to which O'Keeffe and Stieglitz influenced each other’s work", writes art historian Lisa Messinger. "Their subjects are often similar, but their approaches seem vastly different ... Both explored the multiple possibilities of a subject in a thematic series, reworking compositions in order to discover the ultimate solution."

Stieglitz took a symbolist approach to his work, while O'Keeffe came at it systematically, but they equally made use of abstraction in their art. A Celebration (1924), an early cloud painting by O'Keeffe, appears to show the influence of Stieglitz on her work, as Stieglitz was the first to produce identifiable works that incorporated abstraction; O'Keeffe was also the first to experiment with abstraction in her nonobjective work, beginning with Special No. 9. (1915), First Drawing of the Blue Lines, Black Lines, and Blue Lines X (1916), almost a decade before Stieglitz created the Equivalents. Messinger emphasizes that more than technique alone, "it was their equal dedication to perfection that made them compatible as partners and receptive to each other's influence".

In 1929, she began spending more time in New Mexico, with her cow skull paintings becoming some of her best known works during this period (Cow's Skull: Red, White, and Blue, 1931). In 1934, she moved to Ghost Ranch and began working on landscape paintings of the desert. Stieglitz died in 1946, and in 1949, O'Keeffe moved permanently to the town of Abiquiú, where she had a second home as a studio. Here, she produced her famous patio series of paintings (In the Patio VIII, 1950) whose variations and abstractions would develop into her new series, Sky Above Clouds. In 1960, just before she began working on the cloud series, which she would return to off and on for seventeen years, curator Katharine Kuh asked O'Keeffe why she chose to work in the series format. O'Keeffe replied, "I have a single-track mind. I work on an idea for a long time. It's like getting acquainted with a person, and I don't get acquainted easily."

== Development ==
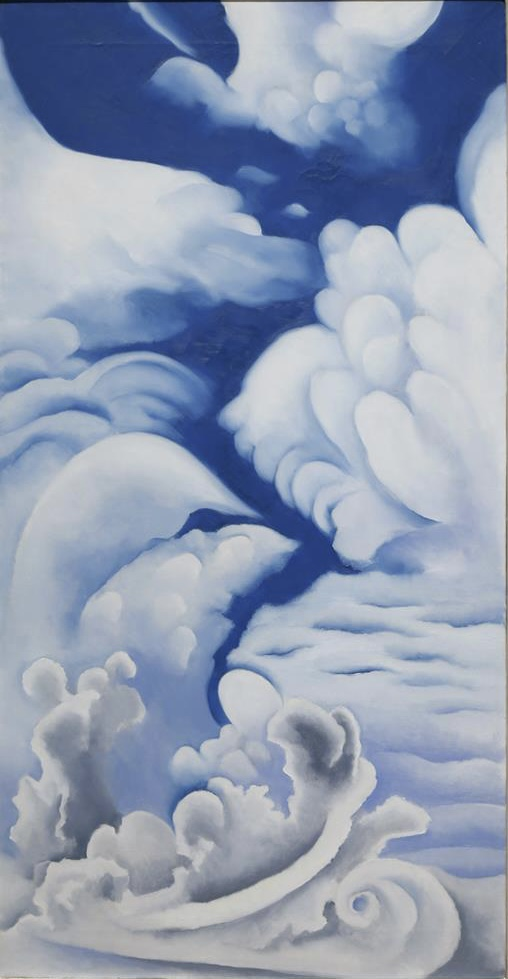
A Celebration (1924)

O'Keeffe had been born in 1887, in the era of the horse and buggy, and was only 16 years old when the Wright brothers made the first controlled powered airplane flights, and 37 years old when she moved into a skyscraper in New York. The post-war aviation era began in the 1950s, and with it, what became known as the Jet Age, bringing the opportunity of commercial air travel to the wider public. Despite her fear of flying, O'Keeffe took advantage of this new experience and she began to travel extensively outside the US at the age of 63, first to Mexico in 1951, Europe in 1953, followed by a trip to Peru in 1956, and finally around the world in 1959.

In the 1950s, O'Keeffe's canvases grew larger, which was a style favored by the contemporaneous abstract expressionists. Although that style of art was popular, O'Keeffe's increasing use of larger sizes was more indicative of the larger world she was now exploring. Her frequent trips on an airplane led to a change in her artistic perspective and viewpoint; (Note: See the overview effect for an analogous cognitive shift. See Messinger 2001, p. 160. O'Keeffe: "What we see from the air is so simple and beautiful I cannot help feeling that it would do something wonderful for the human race—rid it of much smallness and pettiness if more people flew.") her work, which once focused on magnification of her subjects, now became telescopic, and emphasized the importance of the sky itself. From these travel experiences came two new series of paintings based on high altitude views from an airplane: a series of river paintings, and a series showing the sky above the clouds. Between the rivers and clouds series, O'Keeffe also worked on a series of roads, viewed not from above in an airplane, but from high on top of her Abiquiú studio on the mesa.

In 1960, she wrote about the view outside her plane to her younger sister Claudia: "Now the sun is bright over what looks like a vast field of snow stretching all the way to the horizon..It is odd to look out on this field of snow or white cotton— It looks almost solid enough to walk on." The Space Age, which began in 1958, was now well under way, with humanity orbiting around the Earth in just hours. "For O'Keeffe", writes Katherine Hoffman, "achievements in outer space were a way of living out man's dreams, an important achievement". Just five years later, humans were taking their first spacewalk. That same month, O'Keeffe began to explore the last version of this contemporaneous theme in a monumental work of art.

== Series ==
During her last productive period in her career, Georgia O'Keeffe completed a series of approximately 11 cloudscape paintings between 1960 and 1977. Eight of the primary works were completed between 1960 and 1965, with a ninth work in 1966, a tenth work in 1972, and an eleventh installment in the series in 1977. Six of the eleven paintings in this series are minimalist, showing simple strips of sky color on top and a solid or stripes of color, mostly white, on the bottom. Five of the works are representational, with one, An Island with Clouds (1962), considered a failed attempt to initiate the motif, followed by a successful core motif in four "Sky Above Cloud" paintings showing variations on a pink sky above the horizon with patches of cloudlets in the foreground.

Sky Above Clouds IV (1965) is the largest painting by O'Keeffe in her entire collected work, measuring two meters (eight feet) high and seven meters (24 feet) wide. It is considered an extraordinary achievement for the artist, as she accomplished the painting at the age of 77. O'Keeffe was active for a woman in her late 70s, but she began having problems with her eyesight in 1968, eventually losing her central vision due to macular degeneration in 1971. She was left with limited peripheral vision, and made her final painting without assistance in 1972. Undeterred, she continued working throughout the 1970s, and later into the 1980s with assistance from helpers.

=== Sky Above the Flat White Cloud II ===
External image
- Sky Above the Flat White Cloud II, 1960-1964, oil on canvas, Georgia O'Keeffe Museum

Sky Above the Flat White Cloud II is the first cloudscape in O'Keeffe's cloud series that began in the 1960s. It started as a sketch sometime after October 1960 while she was on a six-week tour flying around the Asia-Pacific region, stopping over in Japan, Taiwan, Hong Kong, Vietnam, Thailand, Fiji, Tahiti, Korea, and the Philippines. It was completed in 1964. Art historian Lisa Messinger notes that the design of the painting follows the style of color field and minimalist painters. This was partly achieved by applying thin paint on a huge canvas with simple compositions making use of narrow strips of color at the top, leaving the bottom three-quarters white.

In 1976, O'Keeffe again reminisced about what got her started on the painting and the series: "One day when I was flying back to New Mexico, the sky below was a most beautiful solid white. It looked so secure that I thought I could walk right out on it to the horizon if the door opened. The sky beyond was a light clear blue. It was so wonderful that I couldn't wait to be home to paint it. I couldn't find a canvas the right size so it was painted on one I had—one that was too high and not wide enough." The painting was gifted to the Georgia O'Keeffe Museum in 2006.

=== An Island with Clouds ===
External image
- An Island with Clouds, 1962, oil on canvas, Georgia O'Keeffe Museum

Like Sky Above the Flat White Cloud II before it, the creation of An Island with Clouds in 1962 was influenced by O'Keeffe's six-week trip to Asia in 1960. Unlike her first trip in 1959, the clouds she saw and tried to paint were broken up and patterned into rounded shapes. "The next time I flew", O'Keeffe reminisced, "the sky below was completely full of little oval white clouds, all more or less alike. The many clouds were more of a problem." Messinger believes that An Island with Clouds was O'Keeffe's first attempt to develop this idea, but that it failed to achieve the intended effect. It was not until Above the Clouds I, Messinger argues, that O'Keeffe was able to succeed in reproducing the "little oval white clouds" that she had originally seen from the airplane.

=== Sky with Flat White Cloud ===
External image
- Sky with Flat White Cloud, 1962, oil on canvas, National Gallery of Art

Sky with Flat White Cloud, also known as Sky above White Clouds I, is an abstract, 1962 painting that was inspired by O'Keeffe's trip to Egypt in the spring of that year. The canvas is horizontal, showing blue and green stripes of color (the sky) at the top, while two-thirds of the portion below (the clouds) is white. While abstract, O'Keeffe insisted it was close to photographic quality, as it was almost identical to what she saw outside her airplane window: "Usually, what I paint is something that I see. There was a line around the whole horizon. It was an extraordinary effect. Here was this great white field of clouds solid against the blue."

The painting is a minimalist work that reduces the sky and clouds to distinct planes of color. Minimalism was a popular genre for young artists in the 1960s. O'Keeffe herself compared Sky above White Clouds I to the then-current work of American artist Kenneth Noland. Compositionally, art historian Richard D. Marshall believed the painting was related to the work of Mark Rothko, specifically abstract paintings like No. 5/No. 22 (1950). Sky above White Clouds I was shown at her retrospective exhibition at the Whitney Museum of American Art in New York in 1970, followed by the Art Institute of Chicago and the San Francisco Museum of Art in 1971. It was bequested by O'Keeffe to the National Gallery of Art and entered their collection in 1987.

=== Above the Clouds I ===
External image
- Above the Clouds I, 1962-1963, oil on canvas, Georgia O'Keeffe Museum

Above the Clouds I, also referred to as Sky Above Clouds I, is the first of O'Keeffe's series of four core paintings with a shared motif showing a view through the clouds. It is one of the smallest in the series of four at 91 x 122 cm (36 × 48 in). The clouds appear distinct and puffy, while the brush strokes of the artist are visible. O'Keeffe wrote about how she changed her approach to the series with this painting, tackling the problem of the "many clouds" she previously addressed in Island with Clouds (1962), starting small with Above the Clouds I and moving on to larger canvasses with the next two paintings in the series. Above the Clouds I is the first work by O'Keeffe is this representational cycle of the series to successfully capture the rounded clouds she had seen from the airplane. Messinger describes the finished product as more of a working sketch than a completed work, as the brushwork is uneven, with portions of the canvas lacking paint around the clouds. The painting was first shown at the Brandeis University Creative Arts exhibition at the American Federation of Arts Gallery in New York in 1963. It was acquired by the Georgia O'Keeffe Museum in 1997.

=== Sky Above Clouds II ===
External image
- Sky Above White Clouds II, 1963, oil on canvas, private collection

Sky Above Clouds II doubles the size of Above the Clouds I and finally achieves the effect of infinite space for the first time in the series of cloudscapes. It was first exhibited from December 1963 to February 1964 at the Whitney Museum of American Art. It later appeared, along with I and III, at the touring retrospective of O'Keeffe's work at the Whitney Museum of American Art in 1971, followed by the San Francisco Museum of Art from March 19 to April 25, 1971. The exhibition at the Whitney led to its sale to a private collector. American classical composer Marga Richter based her Concerto No. 2, Landscapes of the Mind I for piano and orchestra on this painting and O'Keeffe's earlier work, Pelvis I (1944). After seeing the paintings in a March 1968 issue of Life magazine, (Note: See Seiberling 1968.) Richter began composing the piece."I read an article about Georgia O'Keeffe which included tiny little pictures of two of her paintings", Richter recalls. "I literally took one look at Sky Above Clouds II and was so inspired by its gentle floating quality that I immediately went to the piano and wrote the opening of what became my piano concerto...I thought the title of my concerto was my own invention, but in 1976, at the time of the premiere, I reread the Life magazine article and found that the author had written, 'O'Keeffe's paintings could be considered landscapes of the mind.'" Architect Steven Holl pointed to Richter's piece and O'Keeffe's painting as inspiration for the 1987-1988 interior redesign of the carpets in an apartment of the 68 story Metropolitan Tower building in Midtown Manhattan. Holl described the unit as a "floating cloud-like habitat...in the evaporative dream state above the metropolis".

=== Sky Above Clouds III ===
External image
- Sky Above Clouds III, 1963, oil on canvas, private collection

Sky Above Clouds III, also known as Above the Clouds III, was first exhibited (along with the large IV) at the fifty year retrospective of O'Keeffe's work at the Amon Carter Museum of American Art from March 17 to May 8, 1966. The Amon Carter exhibition led to its sale to a private collector.

=== Clouds 5/ Yellow Horizon and Clouds ===
External image
- Clouds 5/ Yellow Horizon and Clouds, 1963-1964, oil on canvas, Georgia O'Keeffe Museum

Clouds 5/ Yellow Horizon and Clouds is the last of O'Keeffe's minimalist cycle of cloudscapes in the cloud series during the early 1960s. Drohojowska-Philp writes that O'Keeffe "aimed to recreate atmosphere itself, the feeling of a horizon extending into infinity". A small, abstract, untitled study for the painting was completed in black ballpoint pen on paper. On the front of the study, O'Keeffe specified the color scheme working from the top down as "greyer/ blue/ white/ grey". The final work depicts striated clouds on the bottom of the painting, with a narrow horizon on top in yellow, green, and blue.

=== Sky above Clouds IV ===
External image
- Sky above Clouds IV, 1965, oil on canvas, The Art Institute of Chicago

Sky above Clouds IV, also known as Above the Clouds IV, is O'Keeffe's largest work in her oeuvre, and the last of a series of four cloudscape paintings with a shared motif. In a letter to Adelyn Dohme Breeskin about the painting, O'Keeffe wrote, "I painted a painting 8 ft. high and 24 feet wide...such a size is of course ridiculous but I had it in my head as something I wanted to do for a couple of years".

The large format and design for Sky above Clouds IV was initially inspired by O'Keeffe's visit to the opening ceremony of the John Deere World Headquarters in Moline, Illinois, on June 4, 1964. The new building was originally designed by Finnish-American architect Eero Saarinen (1910–1961), who died several years before its completion. Japanese American landscape architect Hideo Sasaki (1919–2000) designed the campus grounds. O'Keeffe was invited to the ceremony by her friend, designer Alexander Girard (1907–1993), who was commissioned to create a large, monumental mural about the history of the John Deere company for the headquarters. Girard proposed that O'Keeffe should consider a similar painting for the company, and she seemed to support the idea, creating her first sketch of clouds after arriving home from the ceremony.

O'Keeffe told the Fort Worth Star-Telegram that she originally got the idea for Sky above Clouds IV after seeing an "enormous empty white wall" at Deere headquarters. Girard wrote a letter to Deere company president William Alexander Hewitt describing O'Keeffe's idea; it was proposed to hang O'Keeffe's work in the executive dining room facing the lake. Architectural historian Sarah Rovang writes that "O'Keeffe’s abstract clouds would have softened the transition between Saarinen's sleek corporate interior and Sasaki's soft, organic surroundings". Several months later, O'Keeffe was unsure about the commercial work, and with a busy schedule of traveling, painting, and home improvements planned, the project never went forward.

O'Keeffe's 1976 autobiography documents the story behind the creation and exhibition of the painting. O'Keeffe's unheated double garage at her Ghost Ranch studio in Rio Arriba County, New Mexico, was converted into a studio to accommodate the eight by twenty-four foot canvas. She began working on it in June 1965. The preparation of the large canvas required two people, O'Keeffe and her helper Frank Martinez, a native of Abiquiú. It took four days for the both of them to stretch the canvas, as their first attempt failed, necessitating the use of steel strips to hold the stretchers together. To paint it, O'Keeffe constructed platforms to reach the canvas at its highest point, working seven days a week from six in the morning until nine at night without heat, making sure to finish it before the weather got cold. Because the garage was open, O'Keeffe was worried about rattlesnakes attacking her from behind as she worked on the bottom edges while lying on the ground. The painting took the entire summer for her to complete.

The painting was shown under the title Above the Clouds IV at a retrospective exhibition of 95 of her paintings (96 total) at the Amon Carter Museum of American Art (ACMAA) in Fort Worth, Texas, from March 17 to May 8, 1966. In a review of the exhibition, art critic Peter Plagens described the work as innovative, but found its large size reminiscent of both a common billboard as well as a somewhat absurd "metamorphosis of scale into physical reality". Plagens also noted that the audience at the exhibition often misinterpreted the clouds as icebergs.

In 1970, the work was shown at a gallery in Los Angeles with a asking price of $75,000, but it did not sell. The painting appeared in her retrospective exhibition at the Whitney Museum of American Art in New York that same year, followed by The Art Institute of Chicago. At two meters (eight feet) high and seven meters (24 feet) wide, the painting was too large to be hung anywhere at the Whitney but the first floor of the gallery. It was also too large for the San Francisco Museum of Art, so the work remained in Chicago. The painting was then gifted to the Art Institute of Chicago in 1983.

Art historian Barbara Rose called the painting "Possibly the most original of O'Keeffe's outer-space paintings, with space itself as the subject". According to art critic, Laura Cumming, the "monumental" Clouds IV "is the land in the sky: the fields of clouds observed from the aeroplane window; but it is also a most original pictorial idea. It takes O’Keeffe’s lifelong balance of figurative and abstract and fuses them in a painting that is both, but powerfully more." Scholar Linda M. Grasso describes it as "the apotheosis of O'Keeffe's career".

=== Sky with Moon ===
External image
- Sky with Moon, 1966, oil on canvas, private collection

Sky with Moon (1966) continues where O'Keeffe left off with the earlier minimalist cycle of the series seen previously with Clouds 5/ Yellow Horizon and Clouds from 1963-1964. Hunter Drohojowska-Philp notes that O'Keeffe begin noticing serious problems with her vision around this time. It would be her last major painting for the next four years. The painting was previously held by a Swiss private collector since 1999, and was exhibited at the Kunsthaus Zürich from 2003-2004, and at the Schirn Kunsthalle in Frankfurt in 2013. It was sold in 2018 for US $3.49 million.

=== The Beyond ===
External image
- The Beyond, 1972, oil on canvas, Georgia O'Keeffe Museum

The Beyond is a 1972 work in the series (Note: Dunne 2019: "In the 1970s, O'Keeffe took to painting the sky as she saw it from the window of a plane. Two of her works, The Beyond and Sky Above Clouds / Yellow Horizon and Clouds show this view at night and during the day.") that represents O'Keeffe’s last, unaided painting. Around this time, she had previously confided to actor Dennis Hopper, a New Mexico resident and art collector, that she was "almost totally blind" and asked him to keep it a secret. By early 1971, O'Keeffe had lost her central vision in her left eye after a blood clot burst, leaving her with only peripheral vision. She was flown out to Los Angeles and diagnosed with macular degeneration, but it was difficult for her to accept. In a letter, she recalled that her grandfather had experienced blindness, and that the cloudiness in her left eye was beginning to take over her right eye. The painting shows a partly abstract horizon at twilight, with blue sky on top and the lower portion of the canvas in black. On the back of the painting, O'Keeffe wrote "Last One/Not A". The Beyond was featured in the 2018 touring exhibition The Beyond: Georgia O'Keeffe and Contemporary Art, curated by the Crystal Bridges Museum of American Art.

=== Sky Above Clouds / Yellow Horizon and Clouds ===
External image
- Sky Above Clouds / Yellow Horizon and Clouds, 1976-1977, oil on canvas, Georgia O'Keeffe Museum

O'Keeffe returned to the minimalist cloud series with Sky Above Clouds / Yellow Horizon and Clouds (1976–1977). It is similar to her 1962 painting Sky with Flat White Cloud. Due to the loss of O'Keeffe's central vision by 1972, she was helped with the painting by her then, full-time personal assistant Belarmino Lopez. The painting was donated to the Georgia O'Keeffe Museum in 2006.

== Works ==
- Sky Above the Flat White Cloud II, 1960–1964. Oil on canvas, 76.2 x 101.6 cm (30 x 40 in.) Georgia O'Keeffe Museum. CR 1460
- An Island with Clouds, 1962. Oil on canvas, 23 x 32 in. Georgia O'Keeffe Museum. CR 1472
- Sky with Flat White Cloud (Sky Above White Clouds I), 1962. Oil on canvas, 152.4 x 203.2 cm (60 x 80 in.) National Gallery of Art. CR 1473
- Above the Clouds I, 1962–1963. Oil on canvas, 91.8 x 122.6 cm (36 1/8 x 48 1/4 in.) Georgia O'Keeffe Museum. CR 1474
- Sky Above Clouds II, 1963. Oil on canvas, 48 x 84 in. Private collection. CR 1478
- Sky Above Clouds III (Above the Clouds III), 1963. Oil on canvas, 48 x 84 in. Private collection. CR 1479
- Clouds 5/ Yellow Horizon and Clouds, 1963–1964. Oil on canvas, 121.9 X 213.4 cm (48 x 84 in.) Georgia O'Keeffe Museum. CR 1484
- Sky Above Clouds IV (Sky above Clouds IV), 1965. Oil on canvas, 243.8 × 731.5 cm (96 × 288 in.) Art Institute of Chicago. CR 1498
- Sky with Moon, 1966. Oil on canvas, 121.9 x 213.4 cm (48 x 84 in.) Private collection. CR 1505
- The Beyond, 1972. Oil on canvas, 30 1/16 x 40 3/16 inches. Georgia O'Keeffe Museum. CR 1581
- Sky Above Clouds / Yellow Horizon and Clouds, 1976–1977. Oil on canvas, 48 x 84 inches. Georgia O'Keeffe Museum. CR 1618

== Bibliography ==
- Alligood, Chad; Haynes, Lauren (2018). The Beyond: Georgia O'Keeffe and Contemporary Art. Crystal Bridges Museum of American Art. ISBN 9780692103241. OCLC 1041735829.
- Amon Carter Museum of Art (2023). "1966". Carter Museum Timeline. Retrieved September 1, 2023.
- Bencks, Jarret (March 1, 2016). "A small treasure of Georgia O'Keeffe items in Brandeis archives". Brandeis NOW. Brandeis University. Retrieved September 1, 2023.
- Cohen, Gene D. (Dec. 1997) "Sky Above Clouds: Mental Health in Later Life". The American Journal of Geriatric Psychiatry. 5 (1): 1-3. ISSN 1064-7481. OCLC 909921753.
- Curiger, Bice. (2003). "Holding up The Sky". Georgia O'Keeffe. Ostfildern-Ruit: Hatje Cantz. ISBN 9783775713603. OCLC 607018895.
- Cowart, Jack; Hamilton, Juan; Greenough, Sarah (1987). Georgia O'Keeffe: Art and Letters. Boston: Bulfinch Press. ISBN 9780318416403. OCLC 1252145577.
- Crawford, Margaret (April 3, 1971). "O'Keeffe Retrospective". Artweek. 2 (14). ISSN 0004-4121. OCLC 1385458.
- Drohojowska-Philp, Hunter (2005)[2004]. Full Bloom: The Art and Life of Georgia O'Keeffe. New York: W. W. Norton. ISBN 9780393343090. OCLC 1369657418.
- Dunne, Susan (February 26, 2019). "37 Georgia O’Keeffe works hang next to contemporary artists at NBMAA". Hartford Courant. Retrieved January 11, 2024.
- Eipeldauer, Heike; Steininger, Florian (2016). "O'Keeffe's Late Blooms: The Abstract Landscapes". In Barson, Tanya (ed.). Georgia O'Keeffe. Abrams. ISBN 9781419722745. OCLC 1391531020.
- Eldredge, Charles C. (1993). Georgia O'Keeffe: American and Modern. InterCultura, Yale University Press. The Georgia O'Keeffe Foundation. ISBN 0300055765. OCLC 474287855.
- Eldredge, Charles C.(1997). "Chronology". In Hassrick, Peter (ed.). The Georgia O'Keeffe Museum. New York: Harry N. Abrams. The Georgia O'Keeffe Museum. pp. 137-141. ISBN 9780810936850. OCLC 36498997.
- Eyrich, Claire (March 17, 1966). "O'Keeffe Show Spans 50 Years". Fort Worth Star-Telegram. p. 18. Retrieved January 20, 2024.
- Fryd, Vivien Green (2003) Art and the Crisis of Marriage: Edward Hopper & Georgia O'Keeffe. Chicago: University of Chicago Press. ISBN 0226266540. OCLC 46670993.
- Gelb, Lisa Serene; Saltman, David (March 14, 1986). "10 O'Keeffes To National Gallery". The Washington Post. Retrieved January 7, 2024.
- Goodrich, Lloyd; Bry, Doris. (1970). Georgia O'Keeffe: Exhibition and Catalogue by the Whitney Museum of American Art. New York; Art Institute of Chicago; San Francisco Museum of Art. New York. pp. 28, 36. OCLC 233673883.
- Grasso, Linda (2017). Equal under the Sky: Georgia O'Keeffe and Twentieth-Century Feminism. Albuquerque: University of New Mexico Press. ISBN 0826358810. OCLC 976424033.
- Hoffman, Katherine (1984). An Enduring Spirit: The Art of Georgia O'Keeffe. Metuchen, New Jersey: The Scarecrow Press, Inc. ISBN 9780810816725. OCLC 10185136.
- Holl, Steven (1989). Anchoring: Selected Projects, 1975-1988. Princeton Architectural Press. ISBN 0910413193. OCLC 1075528194.
- Hollein, M.; Schlicht, E. (2013). (2013). Letzte bilder: von manet bis kippenberger. Schirn Kunsthalle Frankfurt; Hirmer. ISBN 9783777420394. OCLC 828890776.
- Kennicott, Philip; Cappucci, Matthew (July 16, 2021). "Examining the elements of breathtaking art". The Washington Post. Retrieved September 3, 2021. ISSN 0190-8286. OCLC 2269358.
- Kuh, Katharine (1962). The Artist's Voice: Talks with Seventeen Artists. New York: Harper & Row. OCLC 710851.
- Levere, Jane L. (March 15, 2018) "Georgia O'Keeffe in a New Light, Hawaii to New York and Between". The New York Times. Retrieved January 12, 2024.
- Lisle, Laurie (1997)[1980]. Portrait of an Artist. New York: Washington Square Press. ISBN 9780671600402. OCLC 1082241056.
- Lynes, Barbara Buhler (2001). "O'Keeffe's O'Keeffe's: The Artist's Collection". In Lynes, Barbara Buhler and Bowman, Russell (ed.). O'Keeffe's O'Keeffes: The Artist's Collection. New York: Thames & Hudson. Milwaukee Art Museum. Georgia O'Keeffe Museum. ISBN 0500092990. OCLC 1176026635.
- Lynes, Barbara Buhler (2007). Georgia O'Keeffe Museum Collections. New York: Abrams. ISBN 0671016660. OCLC 232346992.
- Marshall, Richard D. (2007). "Georgia O'Keeffe: Nature and Abstraction". In Marshall, Richard D. (ed.). Georgia O'Keeffe: Nature and Abstraction. Milano: Skira. pp. 13-20. ISBN 9788861301276. OCLC 129517513.
- Miller, Wendy L.; Cohen, Gene D.; Barker, Teresa H. (2016). Sky Above Clouds: Finding Our Way Through Creativity, Aging, and Illness. Oxford University Press. ISBN 9780199371419. OCLC 957124831.
- Mirchandani, Sharon (2012). Marga Richter. Urbana: University of Illinois Press. ISBN 9780252037313. OCLC 788272010.
- Messinger, Lisa Mintz (Autumn 1984). "Georgia O'Keeffe". The Metropolitan Museum of Art Bulletin. New Series. 42 (2): 3-64. ISSN 0026-1521. OCLC 794659868.
- Messinger, Lisa Mintz (1997). "Georgia O'Keeffe: Painting Her Life". In Hassrick, Peter (ed.). The Georgia O'Keeffe Museum. New York: Harry N. Abrams. The Georgia O'Keeffe Museum. pp. 33-72.ISBN 9780810936850. OCLC 36498997.
- Messinger, Lisa Mintz (2001). Georgia O'Keeffe. London: Thames & Hudson. ISBN 0500203407. OCLC 1057621726.
- National Gallery of Art (1989). "1988 Annual Report". National Gallery of Art. ISBN 0894681346. OCLC 924597466.
- National Gallery of Art. (1992). American Paintings: An Illustrated Catalogue. National Gallery of Art. p. 252. ISBN 9780894681714. OCLC 25048408.
- Novak, Barbara (1997). "Georgia O’Keeffe and American Intellectual and Visual Traditions". In Hassrick, Peter (ed.). The Georgia O'Keeffe Museum. New York: Harry N. Abrams. The Georgia O'Keeffe Museum. pp. 73-98.ISBN 9780810936850. OCLC 36498997.
- O'Keeffe, Georgia. (1960-1964). Sky Above the Flat White Cloud II, 1960-1964. Collections Online. Georgia O'Keeffe Museum. Retrieved September 6, 2023.
- O'Keeffe, Georgia. (1962-1963). Above the Clouds I. Collections Online. Georgia O'Keeffe Museum. Retrieved September 1, 2023.
- O'Keeffe, Georgia. (1963-1964a). Untitled (Abstraction). Collections Online. Georgia O'Keeffe Museum. Retrieved January 13, 2024.
- O'Keeffe, Georgia. (1963-1964b). Clouds 5/ Yellow Horizon and Clouds. Collections Online. Georgia O'Keeffe Museum. Retrieved January 13, 2024.
- O'Keeffe, Georgia (1976). Georgia O'Keeffe. New York: Viking Press. ISBN 9780670337101. OCLC 2346134. OCLC 129517513.
- O'Keeffe, Georgia. (1976-1977). Sky Above Clouds / Yellow Horizon and Clouds. Collections Online. Georgia O'Keeffe Museum. Retrieved August 31, 2023.
- Prosyniuk, Joann (1991). Modern Arts Criticism. Volume I. Detroit: Gale Research. pp. 474-495. ISBN 9780810376892. OCLC 23242279.
- Reily, Nancy Hopkins (2014). Georgia O'Keeffe, A Private Friendship. Part II. Sunstone Press. ISBN 9781611390087. OCLC 947849656.
- Robinson, Roxana (1999)[1989]. Georgia O'Keeffe: A Life. Hanover: University Press of New England. ISBN 9780874519068. OCLC 39732936.
- Robinson, Vivian (August 27, 1965). "Artist's Journey to the Top Began at West Texas". Amarillo Globe-Times. p. 14. Retrieved January 14, 2024.
- Rose, Barbara (1997). "O'Keeffe's Originality". In Hassrick, Peter (ed.). The Georgia O'Keeffe Museum. New York: Harry N. Abrams. The Georgia O'Keeffe Museum. pp. 99-136.ISBN 9780810936850. OCLC 36498997.
- Rovang, Sarah (April 2, 2020). "How John Deere and Eero Saarinen Inspired Georgia O’Keeffe’s Largest Painting". Hyperallergic. Retrieved January 20, 2024.
- Scott, Nancy J. (2015). Georgia O'Keeffe. Critical Lives. London: Reaktion Books. ISBN 9781780234663. OCLC 22922145.
- Scott, Yvonne (2007). "Georgia O'Keeffe's Landscapes: Modern and American". In Marshall, Richard D. (ed.). Georgia O'Keeffe: Nature and Abstraction. Milano: Skira. pp. 21-26. ISBN 9788861301276. OCLC 129517513.
- Seiberling, Dorothy (March 1, 1968). "Horizons of a Pioneer". Life. 64 (9): 40-52. ISSN 0024-3019. OCLC 947110599.
- Turner, Elizabeth Hutton; Balge-Crozier, Marjorie P. (1999). Georgia O'Keeffe: The Poetry of Things. Washington D.C., The Phillips Collection. New Haven: Yale University Press in association with the Dallas Museum of Art. ISBN 0300079354. OCLC 40452939.
- Whitney Museum of American Art (1963). Annual Exhibition 1963: Contemporary American Painting. December 11, 1963–February 2, 1964. Exhibition catalogue. New York: Whitney Museum. OCLC 785426589.
- Wilder, Mitchell A. (1966). Georgia O'Keeffe: An Exhibition of the Work of the Artist from 1915 to 1966. Amon Carter Museum of Western Art. OCLC 38603970.
- Wrathall, Claire (December 13, 2019). "Guardian of the Gallery: An interview with James Rondeau". Christie's. Archived from the original on September 1, 2023. Retrieved January 3, 2024.
