= Charles R. Bunnell =

American painter

- Born: Charles Ragland Bunnell; 1897; Kansas City, Missouri
- Died: 1968 (aged 70–71); Colorado Springs, Colorado
- Known for: Painting, Muralist
- Movement: Abstract Expressionism

Charles Ragland Bunnell (1897–1968), was an American painter, printmaker, and muralist.

Bunnell was born in Kansas City, Missouri in 1897. He moved to Colorado Springs in 1915. Bunnell enlisted and served in the United States Army during World War I. He studied at the Broadmoor Art Academy, (now the Colorado Springs Fine Arts Center).

In 1934, Bunnell won a commission from the Public Works of Art Project (PWAP) to complete a mural for West Junior High School in Colorado Springs. He worked with Frank Mechau on the mural for the Colorado Springs Post Office and went on to create paintings for the Federal Art Project of the Works Progress Administration.

Bunnell moved away from American Scene painting and into abstract art. Marika Herskovic's American Abstract Expressionism of the 1950s : an Illustrated Survey (New York School Press, 2003), provides an accounting of this period in Bunnell's stylistic evolution.

In 1964, Bunnell was interviewed for the Archives of American Art's New Deal and the Arts project. His work is in the collections of the Nelson-Atkins Museum of Art, the Taylor Museum in the Colorado Springs Fine Arts Center, and Denver's Kirkland Museum, He died in Colorado Springs in 1968.

== See also ==
- Federal Art Project
- Bodley Gallery
