= Thomas Chimes =

American painter

Thomas Chimes (1921–2009) was a painter and artist from Philadelphia. His work is in important public collections, including those of the Philadelphia Museum of Art, Museum of Contemporary Art, Los Angeles, the Museum of Modern Art in New York, the National Gallery of Art in Washington, D.C., The Phillips Collection in Washington, D.C., the Corcoran Gallery in Washington, D.C., the Ringling Museum of Art in Sarasota, FL, the Pennsylvania Academy of Fine Arts, the Wadsworth Atheneum in Hartford, Connecticut, and the Yale University Art Gallery in New Haven, Connecticut, among others.

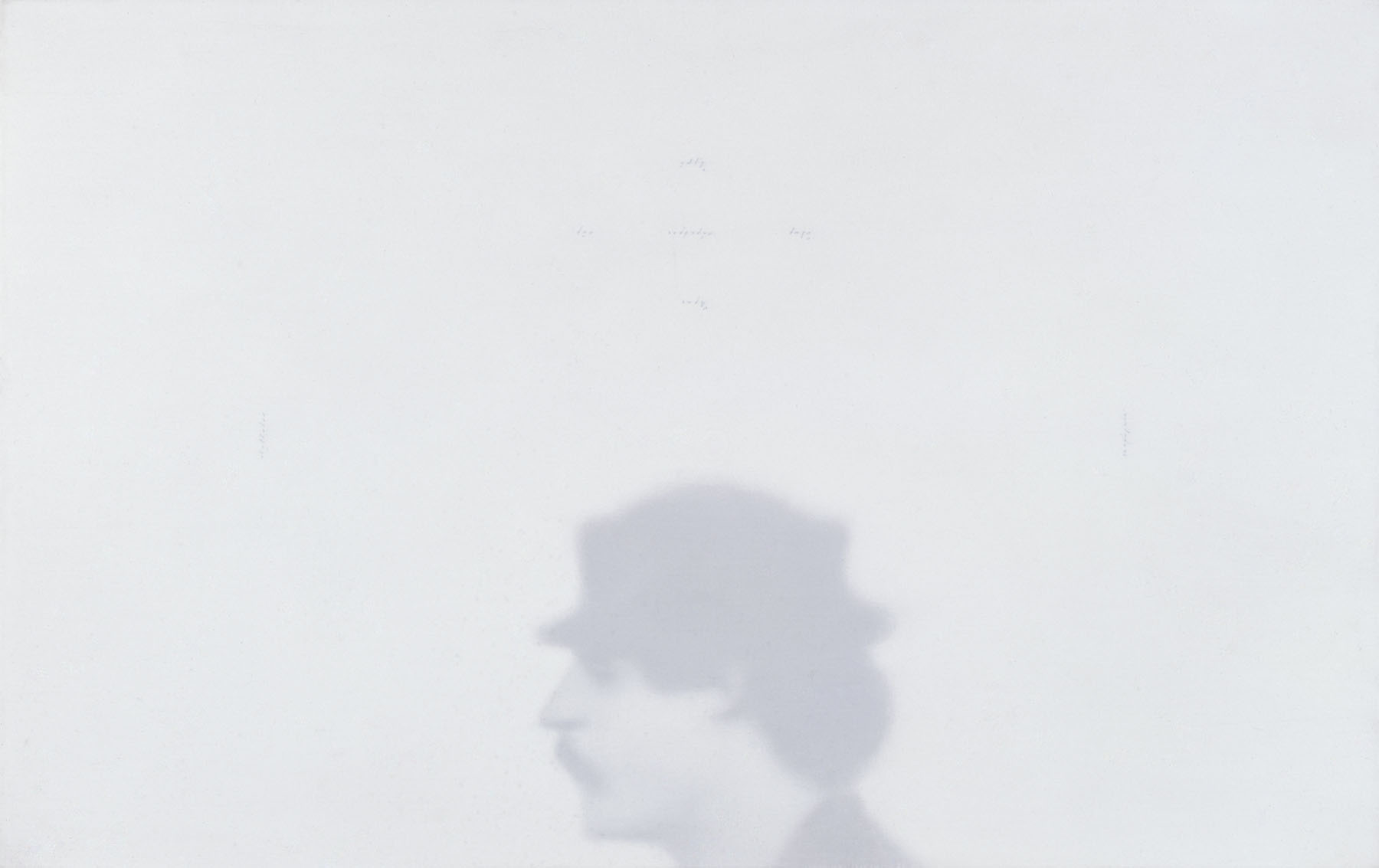
Thomas Chimes Faustroll/Fire 1988, oil on canvas, 34 x 54 inches

== Background ==
Thomas James Chimes was born to Greek immigrant parents in Philadelphia in 1921. In 1939 he became enrolled in the Pennsylvania Academy of Fine Arts. His studies were interrupted by the US involvement in World War 2, in which he joined the US Air Force. After World War 2, Thomas began studying again, in New York: philosophy at Columbia University and painting and sculpture at Art Students League. While there he painted several portraits that fell in line with the New York trends of the time. However, he decided to move back to Philadelphia in 1953 and became a fellow of the National Endowment of the Arts and established his studio there. In Philadelphia, he would develop his own, more personal style.

== Stylistic development ==
Throughout the decades Chimes would continue to reinvent his style with four major periods of work. The artist's work also shows a strong penchant for evocative images reflecting his interest in several of the great writers of the early to middle years of the twentieth century, including Alfred Jarry, Antonin Artaud, and James Joyce. In particular, Jarry's concept of "pataphysics" informs the artist's work.

=== Early works and Crucifixion ===
He painted what came to be known as the Crucifixion paintings from 1958 to 1965 which were both experimentations with his own abstract language and symbolic explorations of his belief in arts natural ability to explore spirituality, consciousness, and the human condition.

=== Metal boxes ===
From 1965 to 1973 Chimes began to experiment with new materials, making mixed media metal box constructions that were typically mounted to the wall. These works are the earliest influences of Chimes's explorations of pataphysics, along with explorations of his interests in rational systems that order the subjective world, erotic references to the body and machines, and embodying cultural icons like Mick Jagger, Marcel Duchamp, John Lennon, and Greta Garbo within their collaged elements.

=== Panel portraits ===
Between 1973 and 1978, Chimes completed a series of 48 portraits in artist-made frames that have been likened to contemporary icons. The portraits are based on both famous and obscure photographs, and began with Alfred Jarry and his literary and cultural circle. Subjects include figures like proto-surrealist playwright Alfred Jarry, poet Arthur Rimbaud, and author Oscar Wilde. Chimes would add satellite contemporary and historic figures that he felt were in dialogue with their symbolist, quasi-surrealist, or pseudoscientific thoughts, making a catalog of references and influences.

=== Late works and white paintings ===
In the 1980s, Chimes began working on a series of white paintings characterized by their minimal clouded surfaces. Many had embedded images in the layers of paint, or raised surfaces of portraits, constellations, and text. Using both Greek, French, and English quotes from alchemical texts and Jarry, he made works that explore 'pataphysics, the human psyche, and Hellenic myth, symbols, and icons. The paintings began as works in oil on canvas and linen but later became increasingly smaller oil on wood panel works that eventually were only three by three inches in size. He continued making the white paintings until he died in 2009.

== Solo exhibitions ==
Chimes had numerous solo exhibitions. According to a 2007 Philadelphia Museum of Art press release, "By the early 1960s Chimes had enjoyed successful solo shows at the Avant-Garde and Bodley Galleries in New York." Many important solo exhibitions followed, including "Thomas Chimes: A Retrospective Exhibition", at the Ringling Museum of Art, Sarasota, in 1968; Tom Chimes, A Compendium: 1961–1986, at Moore College of Art in Philadelphia in 1986; and Thomas Chimes: Survey at New York University's Alexander Onassis Center for Hellenic Studies in 1994. In 1975, his work was included in the Whitney Biennial, and in the following year he was represented in the Philadelphia Museum of Art's landmark exhibition Three Centuries of American Art.

A major recent retrospective was "Thomas Chimes: Adventures in 'Pataphysics" (February 27 – May 6, 2007) at the Philadelphia Museum of Art. It was a full review of his artistic life which included over 100 of his pieces. A 2013 traveling European exhibition "Into the White" and accompanying monograph explored his celebrated later paintings and traveled from the Galerie der Stadt Tuttlingen in Germany to the Benaki Museum in Athens, Greece.

== Museum collections ==
Works by Thomas Chimes are included in many major American museum collections including:

- Corcoran Gallery in Washington, D.C., purchased a large painting by Chimes in 2004.
- Delaware Art Museum
- Museum of Contemporary Art, Los Angeles
- Museum of Modern Art in New York
- National Gallery of Art
- Pennsylvania Academy of the Fine Arts
- Philadelphia Museum of Art.
- Phoenix Art Museum
- Smithsonian American Art Museum
- The Phillips Collection
- Wadsworth Atheneum in Hartford, Connecticut
- Yale University Art Gallery
