= Bodley Gallery =

Coordinates: 40.76191°N 73.96491°W

The Bodley Gallery was an art gallery in New York City, from the late 1940s through the early 1980s. The Bodley specialized in contemporary and modern art. David Mann was director of the gallery during its heyday and Mr. and Mrs. Raymond Braun (a.k.a. Georgie Duffee), were the owners.

== Artists ==
Several of Andy Warhol's earliest exhibitions in New York were at the Bodley during the 1950s, starting with two in 1956. Max Ernst had a major solo exhibition at the Bodley Gallery in 1961, after his works were exhibited with those of Yves Tanguy in a 1960 Bodley Gallery show. Also in 1960, Roberto Matta had a solo show at the Bodley, entitled "Matta, from 1942 to 1957". Other artists who exhibited at the Bodley under Mann's directorship include Victor Brauner, Charles Bunnell, Clarence Holbrook Carter, Thomas Chimes, Louis Delsarte, Jane Frank, Charlotte Gilbertson, Eugenio Granell, Shirley Hendrick, Hank Laventhol, Mina Loy, Larry Rivers, Onni Saari, Ethel Schwabacher, Bettina Shaw-Lawrence, Thomas Sills, and Ahmed Yacoubi.

Although the gallery emphasized the work of living artists, exhibits were not limited to such works—as evidenced by its showing of paintings by Tanguy in 1960, and a 1970 show including works of René Magritte. A 1971 exhibition entitled "Modern Master Drawings" included works by Paul Klee, Fernand Léger, Matisse, and Picasso. The Bodley exhibition record shows a general preponderance of surrealists (including Jorge Noceda Sanchez).

== Early Warhol exhibitions at the Bodley Gallery ==
- "Drawings for a Boy-Book" : February 14 - March 3, 1956
- "The Golden Slipper Show or Shoes Shoe in America" : December 3–22, 1956
- "A Show of Golden Pictures" : December 2–24, 1957
- "Wild Raspberries" : December 1–24, 1959

== Director ==
Apparently David Mann was not the first director of the Bodley Gallery, which seems to have existed already in the late 1940s. According to at least one source, Mann was still director of the Bodley as late as 1981.

== Location ==
According to many sources (including warholstars.com and the 1961 Max Ernst exhibition catalogue listed below), the Bodley Gallery was located (through the 1950s and until at least November 1963, according to the catalogue for a 1963 Jane Frank show) at 223 East 60th Street, in Manhattan's wealthy Upper East Side neighborhood. This would place it between Second and Third Avenues. Presently the storefront is occupied by Dejavu Boutique & Gallery, a luxury fashion boutique selling mostly European clothing. To acknowledge the building's past, the boutique preserved the 2nd floor of the space as an Art Gallery to showcase artwork by established artists and the interior is lined with décor by Mackenzie-Childs.

As of no later than April 1964, the Bodley Gallery had relocated to 787 Madison Avenue (an ad on page 15 of the April 1964 issue of Art in America gives this address). This put it in an even more exclusive section of the Upper East Side, at Madison and 67th Street. That is now the address of Jacadi, which sells upscale children's clothing.

A third address, 1063 Madison Avenue (at 80th Street), seems to have been in effect by about 1975, if not earlier (but no earlier than 1967). 1063 Madison is now the address of a women's fashion boutique called Agnes B.

== General references ==
=== Books ===
- Art in America, Vol. 52, no. 2, April 1964. ISSN 0004-3214 (advertisement on page 15 gives the second of the three known addresses: 787 Madison Avenue)
- Bodley Gallery (New York, N.Y.) Max Ernst : paintings, collages, drawings, sculpture : October 30-November 25, 1961 : Bodley Gallery, 223 East 60, New York (exhibition catalogue and commentary; published by the gallery, 1961) OCLC 54157692
- Bodley Gallery (New York, N.Y.) Modern master drawings 1971 : [exhibition] February 16-March 6, 1971 (New York, N.Y. : The Gallery, 1971) OCLC: 37498294
- Bodley Gallery (New York, N.Y.) Thomas Sills: February 29 -March 11, 1972
- Bodley Gallery (New York, N.Y.) Matta, from 1942 to 1957 (New York : Bodley Gallery, 1960) OCLC 78760494
- Bodley Gallery (New York, N.Y.) Granell (New York : The Gallery, 1965) OCLC 78760528
- Victor Brauner : paintings, encaustics, drawings; 1932 - 1959 / Bodley Gallery <New York, NY> New York, 1961. – 2 Faltbl. : zahlr. Ill. (See "external links" for electronic record of this catalog in German archive.)
- Carter, Clarence Holbrook; James A. Michener; Gimpel & Weitzenhoffer (New York, N.Y.); Bodley Gallery (New York, N.Y.) Clarence Carter : a joint exhibition 30 April through 1 June, 1974 Gimpel & Weitzenhiffer Gallery ... and Bodley Gallery (New York : Gimpel & Weitzenhoffer)
- Ernst, Max; René Magritte; Bodley Gallery (New York, N.Y.) Max Ernst, Magritte : February 17-March 14, 1970 (New York : Bodley Gallery) OCLC: 18858894
- Frank, Jane. Jane Frank (pub. New York, N.Y. : Bodley Gallery, 1963) [gives address as 223 East 60th street, with exhibition dates given as Oct. 22 - Nov. 9th]. OCLC 80892120 (Also available at MICA: see 'External links' for access help.)
- Gilbertson, Charlotte; Bodley Gallery (New York, N.Y.); Charlotte Gilbertson (exhibition): Bodley Gallery, New York City (New York : The Gallery, 1971) OCLC 10480617
- Hausman, Fred. Hausman, the human pattern II : (exhibition), Bodley Gallery, 787 Madison Avenue, New York City, October 24-November 5, 1966 (New York : The Gallery, 1966) OCLC: 14274993
- Loy, Mina; and Julien Levy. Constructions, April 14-25, 1959 (New York : Bodley Gallery, 1959) OCLC: 11251843
- Perutz, Dolly; Bodley Gallery (New York, N.Y.). Dolly Perutz : (1908-1979) : the last 25 years of her work : sculpture·graphics·encaustics : January 27 through February 14, 1981 : Bodley Gallery. (New York : The Gallery, 1981) OCLC 80195043
- Schwabacher, Ethel; Jeanne Reynal; Bodley Gallery (New York, N.Y.) Of people : Ethel Schwabacher, pastels : Jeanne Reynal, mosaics. (New York : Bodley Gallery, 1976) OCLC: 48706042
- Stanton, Phoebe B., "The Sculptural Landscape of Jane Frank" (A.S. Barnes: South Brunswick, New Jersey, and New York City, 1968) ISBN 1-125-32317-5 (The book lists two exhibitions for Jane Frank at the Bodley Gallery, in 1963 and 1967).
- "Goings On About Town." The New Yorker Vol. 51, May 5, 1975, p. 8a; listing exhibition "through May 17th" and shows the gallery's location at 1063 Madison Ave at 80th.)

=== Other ===
- "What's New in Art", The New York Times; Sunday, April 2, 1967; listing art openings for Monday (April 3) including "JANE FRANK - Bodley Gallery, 787 Madison Avenue. Paintings. To April 21." (This verifies that the gallery was still located at 787 Madison Avenue as late as April 1967.)
