= Charlotte Gilbertson =

American painter and printmaker (1922–2014)

- Born: November 11, 1922; Boston, Massachusetts
- Died: April 12, 2014 (aged 91); Palm Beach, Florida
- Known for: Painting and printmaking

Charlotte Gilbertson (November 11, 1922 – April 12, 2014) was an American painter and printmaker.

== Artistic influences ==
Charlotte's artistic inspirations were rooted in Greek mythology, the French artist Paul Cézanne, Fernand Léger's modern abstractionism, and neo-Primitivist representations of the people of Papua New Guinea.

== Biography ==
=== Childhood and early years ===
Born in Boston on Armistice Day, Gilbertson was the eldest of four children and the only daughter in her family. Her father was a Methodist minister in the neighborhood of Roslindale, Boston, Massachusetts, where her family resided. As a child, her family lived primarily in Roslindale and spent their summers on Cape Cod at their summer residence.

=== Post WWII, Paris and the GI Bill (1946–1951) ===
Gilbertson enlisted in the Armed Forces during World War II (WWII) as a psychiatric social worker, stationed on Long Island, New York, and in Georgia. After the war, she had access to the G.I. Bill of Rights, as did many of the war veterans of her generation. Charlotte used it to promote her education. She graduated from Boston University’s School of Fine Arts in 1948 and then moved to New York. In New York City, she was more interested in "constructive design" not found in America. Charlotte wanted to develop a stronger sense of "design" in her work, to engage "the new" and "the modern".

In 1949, Gilbertson went to Paris, fascinated by Cézanne's rendering of the Provençal apple. She studied "le dessin" under the French artist Fernand Léger at his Paris atelier. She found a master in Léger. (He jokingly referred to her as "la petite marine", or "the little sailor", because she wore dungarees, which was unusual for a woman at the time.)

=== In New York City (1951–1979) ===
She returned to New York City in 1951, where she lived for several years. (Note: In 1952, a pair of Léger murals was installed in the General Assembly Hall of the United Nations headquarters in New York, New York. Some of Léger's works are found at the Museum of Modern Art (MOMA) in New York City. In November 2003, his painting, La femme en rouge et vert, sold for US$22,407,500, and his sculptures have been selling in excess of US$8 million.) Charlotte Gilbertson found several jobs in New York City.

During the winters, she worked; during the summers, she painted. This seasonal cycle of employment and painting lasted from 1951 to 1974 and again from 1977 to 1979. From 1962 to 1974, Charlotte most notably worked as an assistant director and, later, as director of the Alexander Iolas Gallery in New York City. Through the Iolas Gallery, Charlotte met and befriended Andy Warhol and appeared in Warhol's film, Kiss.

=== World travels ===
In 1976, Gilbertson took a polar route around the world, following the sun, and spent over a year traveling the world. She visited Japan, Hong Kong, Australia, Bali, Burma, India, Nepal, the Middle East, Turkey, Greece, Finland, Sweden and Norway, with a special trip to the North Cape. The Japanese and Balinese landscapes influenced her paintings during this time. In 1980, she stopped traveling to care for her elderly parents until they died.

In 1990, Gilbertson resumed her travels to many other countries, including Belize, Fiji, Papua New Guinea, Australia, Bali, India and Nepal. Her explorations in Nepal included treks of the Annapurna Circuit and safaris by an elephant in Nepal's Chitwan National Park. She spent time in Tibet, Thailand, Malaysia, and Singapore, ending her journeys in Western Europe with extended time in Paris and London before returning home.

=== Later years ===
Gilbertson continued as a painter, working with mixed media. She completed a series of works on her memory impressions of Papua New Guinea, 50" × 72", and on wood panels, employing gold leaf and other mixed media. Many of her paintings in the 1990s featured neo-Primitivist representations of the people of Papua New Guinea.

== Exhibitions ==
Year	Gallery / Exhibition space	Location
1949	Galeria Mai	Paris (VI arrondissement—Quartier Latin), France
1960	Burr Gallery	New York City
1961	Pratt Institute Gallery	New York City
1962	The Free Library of Philadelphia	Philadelphia, Pennsylvania
1964	PVI Gallery	New York City
1965	Institute of Contemporary Arts	Philadelphia, Pennsylvania
1966	Fishbach Gallery	New York City
1967	Flint College Museum	Flint, Michigan
1968–1969	Brooklyn Museum	Brooklyn, New York
1971	Bodley Gallery	New York City
1972–1978	Erik Nord Gallery	Nantucket, Massachusetts
1974	Iolas Gallery	New York City
1977	Bodley Gallery II	New York City
1878	As You Like It Gallery	Palm Beach, Florida
1978	Irving Gallery	Palm Beach, Florida
1978	Pace University Gallery	New York City
1978	St Peter's College Gallery	Jersey City, New Jersey
1979	Lilley Gallery	Harwichport, Massachusetts
1979	Holly Daly Herman Palm Beach Gallery	Palm Beach, Florida
1980	Galeria Bryna	Palm Beach, Florida
1981	Galeria Bryna	Palm Beach, Florida
1981	Flagler Museum, Artinian Collection	Palm Beach, Florida
1982	Petite Fleur Gallery	Palm Beach, Florida
1983	Rollins College	Winter Park, Florida
1984	Foxworth Gallery	New York City
1989	Palm Beach National Bank	Palm Beach, Florida
1991	Northwood College Gallery	West Palm Beach, Florida
1998	Guild of Harwich Artists	Harwichport, Massachusetts
2000	Eissey Campus Gallery	North Palm Beach, Florida

== Professional associations and listings ==
Gilbertson was included in Who's Who in America (2002). She is also a lifetime member of the Visual Arts and Galleries Association.
