= Cloud Appreciation Society =

British organization, founded 2005

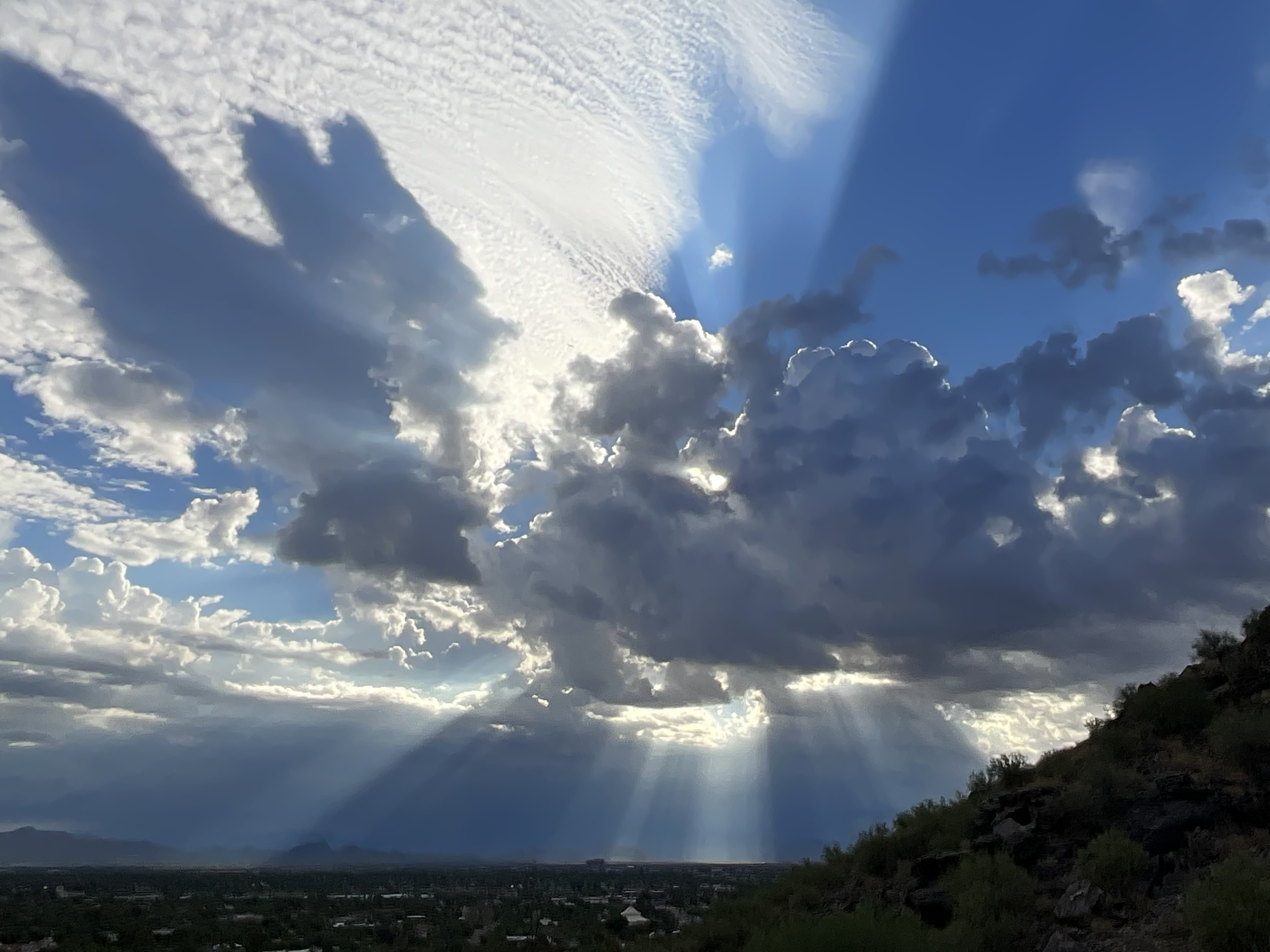
- Around the Cumulus in this image are crepuscular rays, the beams of light and shade are actually parallel, but they fan out due to the effect of perspective.
- Formation: 2005; 21 years ago
- Founder: Gavin Pretor-Pinney
- Type: Fan club
- Headquarters: United Kingdom
- Location: Global
- Members: 60 thousand
- Official language: English
- Publication: The Cloudspotter's Guide
- Website: cloudappreciationsociety.org

The Cloud Appreciation Society is a society founded by Gavin Pretor-Pinney from the United Kingdom in January 2005. The society aims to foster understanding and appreciation of clouds, and has over 60,000 members from 120 countries, as of September 2023.

Yahoo! named the society's website as "the most weird and wonderful find on the internet for 2005". The group and its founder were the focus of a BBC documentary Cloudspotting, based on Pretor-Pinney's book The Cloudspotter's Guide. During a 2017 episode of Taskmaster, comedian Hugh Dennis revealed he is a member of the society.

In 2017, the Cloud Appreciation Society was credited with adding the Asperitas classification of cloud to the World Meteorological Organization's International Cloud Atlas.

== See also ==
- "Both Sides, Now"
- Cloudscape (art)
- Cloudscape photography
