= Egleston Substation =

- U.S. National Register of Historic Places
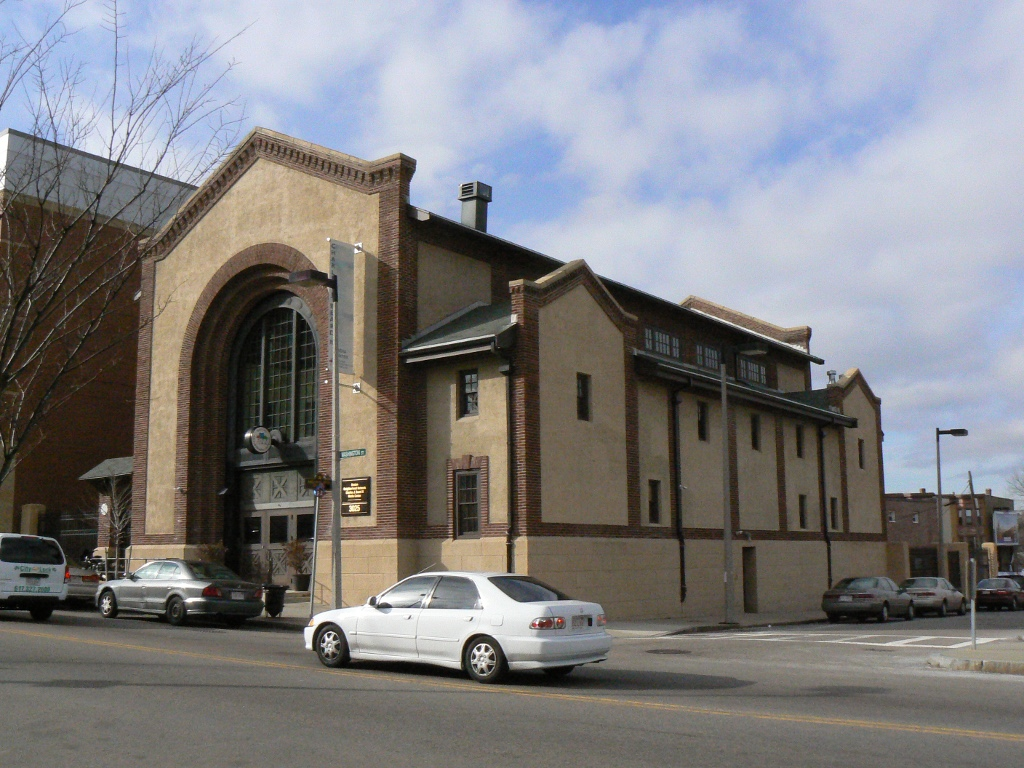

- Location within Massachusetts Location within the United States
- Location: 3025 Washington Street, Jamaica Plain, Boston, Massachusetts
- Coordinates: 42°19′1″N 71°5′51″W
- Built: 1909
- Architectural style: Renaissance Revival
- NRHP reference No.: 10001066
- Added to NRHP: December 27, 2010

The Egleston Substation is a historic electrical substation building located at 3025 Washington Street in the Roxbury neighborhood of Boston, Massachusetts, just north of Egleston Square. The brick Renaissance Revival building was constructed in 1909 by the Boston Elevated Railway (a predecessor to today's MBTA) during the extension of the Washington Street Elevated to Forest Hills.

The building is 87 feet (27 m) long, 52 feet (16 m) wide, and 46 feet (14 m) high. Its most prominent feature is the massive archway that frames the main entrance on Washington Street. The building was designed by Robert S. Peabody of Peabody and Stearns. The building was use by the Boston Elevated and its successors to provide AC to DC conversion for streetcars and elevated trains until 1987, at which time it was one of the oldest such substations in the nation. The building was essentially abandoned and fell into disrepair, with its roof in failure in 2005. It was then acquired by local nonprofits, who have converted it for use as office and television studio space.

The building was listed on the National Register of Historic Places in 2010.

== See also ==
- Roslindale Substation
- National Register of Historic Places listings in southern Boston, Massachusetts
