= Susan Crile =

American painter and printmaker

- Born: 1942; Cleveland, Ohio
- Known for: Painting
- Website: www.susancrile.com

Susan Crile (born 1942) is an American painter and printmaker.

== Biography ==
Crile was born in 1942 in Cleveland, Ohio. She attended Bennington College, graduating in 1965.

In 1972 Crile was interviewed by Paul Cummings for the Archives of American Art. The same year her image was included the iconic poster Some Living American Women Artists by Mary Beth Edelson.

Her work has political themes, such as work based on images of torture at Abu Ghraib prison in Iraq after the 2003 U.S. invasion. Many of these images are faceless and rendered in reddish or grayish mud tones and textures, suggestive of clay, slate, or dust (or perhaps the color is, as the New York Times commented, "fecal brown"). The victims themselves are outlined in ghostly white chalk, becoming, in the words of the New York Times review, "spectral icons of martyrdom."

Her work is in the collections of the Albright–Knox Art Gallery, the Metropolitan Museum of Art, the Phillips Collection, the Brooklyn Museum, the Hirshhorn Museum, and the Cleveland Museum of Art,

In 2017, Crile produced a Three part series on documenting the abusive behaviour within the Prison system. The artwork depicted Prisoner Brutality such as, artwork showing men being stepped on, placed in small boxes and more, highlighting the physical and mental abuse in her work. The aim of her work was to highlight the destructive and detrimental ways prisoners are treated. The work was on display in the Lukacs and Experimental Space Galleries in Loyola Hall.

== See also ==
- Aerial landscape
- Protest art
