= Katharine Kuh =

American art historian

- Born: Katharine Woolf; July 15, 1904; St. Louis, Missouri
- Died: January 10, 1994 (aged 89); New York City
- Education: Vassar College, University of Chicago, New York University
- Known for: Art critic, curator

Katharine Kuh (née Woolf; 1904–1994) was an art historian, curator, critic, and dealer from Chicago, Illinois. She was the first woman curator of European art and sculpture at the Art Institute of Chicago.

== Life ==
Katharine Woolf was born on July 15, 1904, in St. Louis, Missouri. She was the youngest daughter of Olga Weiner and Morris Woolf, a silk importer. The family moved to Chicago in 1909. Kuh contracted polio while traveling through Europe in 1914, and spent the next ten years in a body brace. It was during this time that she began collecting Old Master prints, sparking her interest in art history.

Kuh planned to study economics, but instead studied art history with Alfred H. Barr at Vassar College, and went on to earn an MA in Art History from the University of Chicago. She started a Ph.D. in Art History at New York University but left the program after a year in order to marry the Chicago businessman George Kuh. In November 1935, following the dissolution of her marriage, Kuh opened The Katherine Kuh Gallery in Chicago. It was one of Chicago's first commercial art galleries that exhibited avant-garde art. Kuh described her gallery's focus on emerging artists in her memoir, My Love Affair with Modern Art: "I showed the work of dozens of artists, often while they were still struggling for public recognition. I think immediately of Alexander Archipenko, László Moholy-Nagy, Fernand Léger, Stuart Davis, Isamu Noguchi, Paul Klee, Joan Miró, Ansel Adams, Edward Weston, and Josef Albers, who had one of his earliest exhibitions in America at my gallery."

The modern art that Kuh chose to exhibit was not enjoyed by all, however. Her gallery became a focus of the group Society for Sanity in Art whose mission was to stamp out modern art to protect civilization. They would storm the gallery to admonish the art & the visitors. It is believed that in November 1938, the group broke into the gallery in the middle of the night, and despite the walls being covered with work by artist Joan Miró, none were damaged. Kuh believed that the assailants were after her.

Despite the challenges posed by the Great Depression and World War II, Kuh kept her gallery running successfully until 1943 when she was hired by the Art Institute of Chicago. In 1954, Kuh became the museum's first Curator of Modern Painting and Sculpture, a position that she held until 1959. During the first year of her tenure with the Art Institute of Chicago in 1954, she gave Mark Rothko his first museum exhibition, and the next year, she arranged the institute's purchase of Jackson Pollock's "Greyed Rainbow".

One of Kuh's responsibilities at the Art Institute was curating the exhibition American Artists Paint the City for the 1956 Venice Biennale. The Art Institute was responsible for organizing the American exhibition, and Kuh selected works by a variety of artists including Jacob Lawrence, John Marin, Georgia O'Keeffe, Jackson Pollock, and Mark Tobey.

Following her 1959 resignation from the Art Institute, Kuh moved to New York City, where she worked as an art critic for the Saturday Review until 1978.

Kuh authored several books, including Art Has Many Faces (1951), The Artist's Voice (1962, a volume of interviews with 17 artists), Break-Up: The Core of Modern Art (1965, a history of modern art from Monet to Pollock), and The Open Eye: In Pursuit of Art (1971, a collection of her essays from the Saturday Review).

Kuh died on January 10, 1994, in New York City.
