= Museum Conservation Institute =

Center for materials conservation and technical research

- Established: 1963
- Location: Suitland, Maryland, US
- Public transit access: Suitland
- Website: https://mci.si.edu/

The Smithsonian's Museum Conservation Institute (MCI) aims to be the center for specialized conservation and technical collection research for all of the Smithsonian museums and collections. MCI's staff combine state-of-the-art instrumentation and scientific techniques with the knowledge of materials and the history of technology to provide technical research studies and interpretation of art, as well as historical and anthropological objects, to improve the conservation and collections storage capabilities at the Smithsonian. For the majority of the Smithsonian collections, MCI is the only Smithsonian resource for technical studies and analyses.

== History ==
The Smithsonian's Board of Regents established the Conservation Research Laboratory of the United States National Museum in 1963 in response to a growing need to support conservation of the entire Institution's collections.

In 1965 the name of the laboratory was changed to the Conservation Analytical Laboratory (CAL). In 1983, the laboratory moved to the Museum Support Center in Suitland, Maryland. Congress mandated a national conservation training program among other wider responsibilities including an expanded conservation science research program.

The Board of Regents approved a name change to the Smithsonian Center for Materials Research and Education (SCMRE) in 1998. SCMRE's mission was to serve all museum communities - national and international, and provide professional training and education programs.

In 2006 the Board of Regents approved the name change to the Museum Conservation Institute (MCI).

== Directors ==
Sanchita Balachandran, 2024-

Jessica S. Johnson, Acting Director, 2023-2024

Robert J. Koestler, 2004-2023

Lambertus van Zelst, 1984–2003

Robert M. Organ, 1967–1983

Charles H. Olin, 1966–1967

== Facilities ==
MCI's laboratories are equipped with advanced analytical instrumentation, including:

- isotope ratio (or stable isotope) mass spectrometry
- inductively coupled plasma mass spectrometry
- Fourier transform infrared spectrometry
- Raman spectrometry, including Fourier transform Raman and portable Raman spectroscopy
- gas chromatography
- pyrolysis-gas chromatography-mass spectrometry
- optical microscopy
- proteomics
- scanning electron microscopy with X-ray and energy dispersive fluorescence
- X-ray radiography
- ultraviolet-visible light spectrophotometry
- structured 3-D color scanning of objects

The Smithsonian's Museum Conservation Institute and the Institut Photonique d’Analyse Non-destructive Européen des Matériaux Anciens platform at Soleil have formed a partnership to use the power of the third-generation synchrotron to study and preserve the priceless Smithsonian collections.
