= Cloudscape (art) =

Artistic depiction of a view of clouds or the sky

A cloudscape painting by Jacob Isaakszoon van Ruisdael

In art, a cloudscape is the depiction of a view of clouds or the sky. Usually, as in the examples seen here, the clouds are depicted as viewed from the earth, often including just enough of a landscape to suggest scale, orientation, weather conditions, and distance (through the application of the technique of aerial perspective). The terms cloudscape and skyscape are sometimes used interchangeably, although a skyscape does not necessarily require a view of clouds.

A highly complex cloudscape—as in some works of J. M. W. Turner, for example—within an otherwise conventional landscape painting, can sometimes seem like an abstract painting-within-a-painting, nearly obliterating the realistic setting with a grand display of gestural force. Some critics have explicitly cited 19th century cloudscapes and seascapes as precursors of the work of abstract expressionist artists such as Helen Frankenthaler.

Thus, commenting on a 1999 Turner exhibition, The New York Times art critic Roberta Smith writes that, in 1966, "the Museum of Modern Art established the artist's lush late works ... as precursors of both Impressionism and modernist abstraction. The current show is a feast of Frankenthaleresque plumes of color....". Smith further observes that such works "conflate extremes of sea and sky with extremes of painting, showing both to contain elements of the unfathomable and the unknown."

There are some later cloudscape paintings - for example, the Sky Above Clouds series by Georgia O'Keeffe - in which the clouds are seen from above, as though viewed from an airplane. "Traveling around the world, she was exhilarated by the views seen from an airplane window." Such "airborne-view" cloudscapes are in a sense aerial landscapes, except that typically there is no view of the land at all: only white clouds, suspended in (and even below) blue sky.

== Image gallery ==
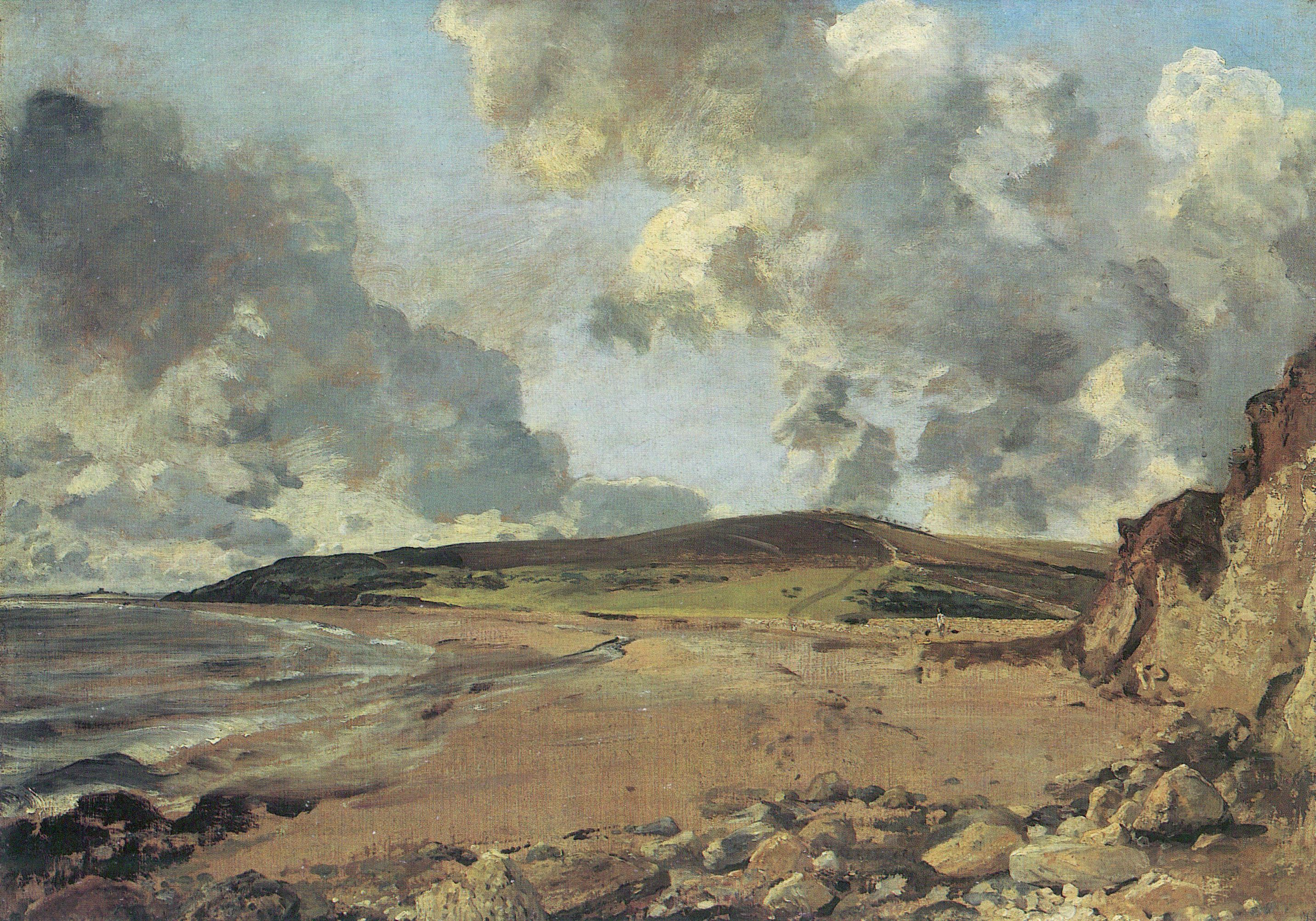
Weymouth Bay by John Constable, c. 1816

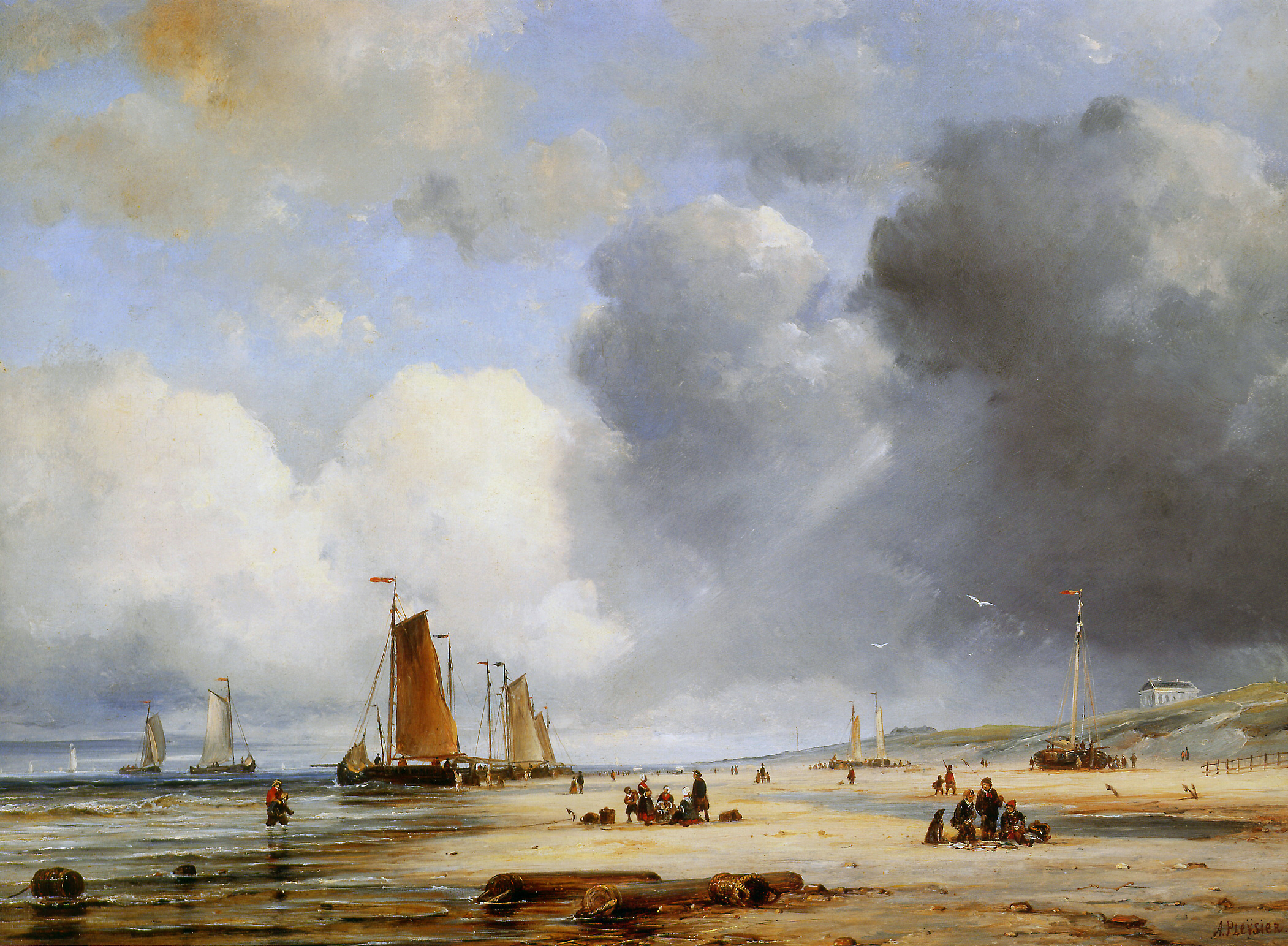
Beach View With Boats by Ary Pleysier

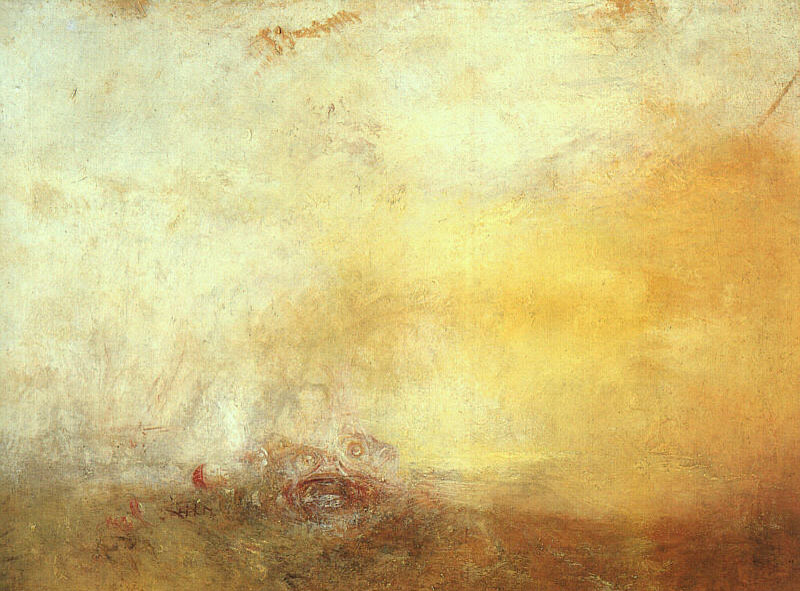
Sunrise with Sea Monsters by J. M. W. Turner (1845)

== See also ==
- Aerial landscape art
- Cloud Appreciation Society
- Landscape art
- Seascape
- Cloudscape (photography)
