= List of people with given name Rebecca =

Following is a list of people with the given name Rebecca, or its variants (Rebekah, Rebeka, etc.) or diminutives (Bec, Becky, etc.):

== A ==
- Rebecca Abe (born 1967), German writer and illustrator
- Rebecca Abergel (fl. 2000s–2010s), French chemist
- Rebecca Adam (fl. 2010s–2020s), Australian lawyer and business executive
- Rebecca Adamson (born 1950), American Cherokee businessperson and advocate
- Rebecca Addelman (born 1981), Canadian comedian, writer, director and actress
- Rebecca Adler-Nissen (fl. 2000s–2010s), Danish political scientist
- Rebecca Adlington (born 1989), British competitive swimmer
- Rebecca Akweley Adotey (fl. 1990s–2000s), Ghanaian politician
- Rebecca Akufo-Addo (born 1951), Ghanaian public figure
- Rebecca Alexander (born 1979), American psychotherapist and author
- Rebecca Allen (disambiguation), multiple people
- Rebecca Alleway (fl. 2000s–2010s), English set decorator
- Rebecca Allison (born 1946), American cardiologist and transgender activist
- Rebecca Alpert (born 1950), American professor of Jewish American religious history
- Rebecca Patricia Armstrong (born 2002), Thai-British actress, singer and model
- Rebecca Anderson (born 1991), American beauty pageant titleholder
- Rebecca Andridge (fl. 1990s–2020s), American statistician
- Rebecca Angus (born 1985), English football striker
- Rebecca Anweiler (born 1959), Canadian visual artist
- Rebecca Agatha Armour (1845–1891), Canadian teacher and novelist
- Rebecca Aronson (fl. 2000s–2010s), American poet
- Rebecca Artis (born 1988), Australian professional golfer
- Rebecca Naa Dedei Aryeetey (1923–1961), Ghanaian business woman, political activist and a feminist
- Rebecca Kellogg Ashley (1695–1757), English child captured and raised by Haudenosaunee Mohawks
- Rebecca Atkinson (disambiguation), multiple people
- Rebecca Merritt Smith Leonard Austin (1832–1919), American amateur botanist and naturalist
- Rebecca Ayoko (born c. 1960), Togolese international catwalk model

== B ==
- Rebecca Bace (1955–2017), American computer security expert
- Rebecca Bailey (born 1974), New Zealand road cyclist
- Rebecca Balding (1955–2022), American actress
- Rebecca Ballhaus (born 1991), Pulitzer Prize-winning American journalist
- Rebecca Barnard (born 1960), Australian musician
- Rebecca Barnett (fl. 2000s–2010s), New Zealand squash player
- Rebecca Barrow, British young adult author
- Rebecca Lilith Bathory (fl. 2000s–2010s), British photographer
- Rebecca Bauer-Kahan (born 1978), American attorney and politician
- Rebecca Beardmore (fl. 1990s–2010s), Canadian contemporary printmaker, photographer and installation artist
- Rebecca Bedford (born 1998), English para-badminton player
- Rebecca Beeson (born 1997), Australian rules footballer
- Rebecca Bell (born 1953), American environmental educational specialist
- Rebecca Belmore (born 1960), interdisciplinary Anishinaabekwe artist
- Rebecca Bennett (brewer) (born 1983), American brewmaster
- Rebecca Bennett (born 1999), Australian 400 m sprinter
- Rebecca Benson (born 1990), Scottish actress
- Rebecca White Berch (born 1955), justice of the Arizona Supreme Court
- Rebecca Berg (disambiguation), multiple people
- Rebecca M. Bergman (fl. 1980s–2020s), American chemical engineer and the president of Gustavus Adolphus College
- Rebecca Best (born 1964), English-born professional squash player for Ireland
- Rebecca Betensky (fl. 1980s–2010s), professor of biostatistics in the Harvard T.H. Chan School of Public Health
- Rebekka Aleida Biegel (1886–1943), Dutch applied psychologist
- Rebecca Bigler (fl. 1980s–2010s), developmental psychologist
- Rebecca L. Binder (fl. 1970s–2010s), American architect
- Rebecca Birk (fl. 2010s–2020s), English Liberal Jewish rabbi
- Rebecca Black (born 1997), American singer
- Rebecca Blaikie (fl. 2000s–2010s), Canadian politician
- Rebecca Blank (1955–2023), American government official and academic administrator
- Rebecca Blasband (born 1967), American singer-songwriter, screenwriter, and television personality
- Rebecca Bluestone (born 1953), American artist and studio trained tapestry weaver
- Rebeccah Blum (1967–2020), American art historian and curator
- Rebecca Blumenstein (fl. 1990s–2010s), journalist and newspaper editor
- Rebecca Blumhagen (fl. 2010s–2020s), American actress and filmmaker
- Rebecca Wright Bonsal (1838–1914 or 1842–1914), American Quaker teacher
- Rebecca Boone (1739–1813), American pioneer married to famed frontiersman Daniel Boone
- Rebeca Uribe Bone (1917–2017), chemical engineer, first woman to graduate in engineering in Colombia.
- Rebecca Borga (born 1998), Italian sprinter
- Rebeccah Bornemann (born 1971 or 1972), Canadian para-swimmer
- Rebecca Bossavy (born 1995), French handball player
- Rebecca Botwright (born 1982), English professional squash player
- Rebecca Bradley (born 1971), American lawyer and judge
- Rebecca Bradley (bandit) (1905–1950), American bank robber
- Rebecca Bradley (novelist), Canadian novelist and archaeologist
- Rebecca Brandewyne (born 1955), American romance novelist
- Rebecca Breeds (born 1987), Australian actress
- Rebecca Wilson Bresee (fl. 1990s–2010s), American computer animator at Disney
- Rebecca Brewer (born 1983), Canadian multi-disciplinary artist
- Rebecca Brooke (1952–2012), American pornographic actress and model
- Rebecca Bross (born 1993), American artistic gymnast and six-time World Championship medalist
- Rebecca Broussard (born 1963), American actress and model
- Rebecca Brown (disambiguation), multiple people
- Rebecca Bryant (born 1963), Australian professional tennis player
- Rebecca Buckley (born 1933), medical doctor and researcher of pediatric immunological diseases
- Rebecca Budig (born 1973), American actress and television presenter
- Rebecca Bulley (born 1982), Australia netball international player
- Rebecca Bunting (fl. 2010s–2020s), Vice-Chancellor of the University of Bedfordshire
- Rebecca Burlend (1793–1872), author of the journal and guide, A True Picture of Emigration
- Rebecca Burns (fl. 2000s–2010s), journalist, professor, author, and speaker

== C ==
- Rebecca Caine (born 1959), Canadian soprano opera singer and musical theatre performer
- Rebecca M. Calisi Rodriguez (born 1979), American neuroendocrinologist, wildlife biologist, and National Geographic Explorer
- Rebecca Callard (born 1975), English actress and writer
- Rebecca Camilleri (born 1985), Maltese athlete specialising in the long jump and sprinting events
- Rebecca Cammisa (fl. 2000s–2010s), American documentary filmmaker
- Rebecca Campbell (disambiguation), multiple people
- Rebecca L. Cann (born 1951), American geneticist who made a scientific breakthrough on mitochondrial DNA variation and evolution in humans
- Rebecca Cantrell (fl. 2000s–2010s), American author
- Rebecca Cardon (born 1975), American actress and personal trainer
- Rebecca Carrington (born 1971), English musical comedian
- Rebecca Carroll (born 1969), American writer, editor and radio producer
- Rebecca Carter (born 1996), Australian cricketer
- Rebecca Caudill (1899–1985), American author of children's literature
- Rebecca Chace (fl. 1990s–2010s), American novelist, playwright, screenwriter, and actor
- Rebecca Chalker (born 1943), American health writer and women's rights activist
- Rebecca Chamberlain (fl. 1990s–2010s), American visual artist and musician
- Rebecca Chambers (disambiguation), multiple people
- Rebecca Chan (born 1958), Hong Kong actress
- Rebecca Chavez-Houck (fl. 1970s–2010s), member of the Utah State House of Representatives
- Rebecca Chin (born 1991), British rower
- Rebecca Chiu (born 1978), Hong Kong squash player
- Rebecca Chopp (fl. 2000s–2010s), chancellor of the University of Denver
- Rebecca Chua (born 1953), Singaporean author
- Rebecca Chan Chung (1920–2011), Chinese World War II veteran nurse with the Flying Tigers and the United States Army in China
- Rebecca Parr Cioffi (fl. 1980s–2010s), American television writer, story editor and producer
- Rebecca Clarke (disambiguation), multiple people
- Rebecca Cliffe (born 1990), British zoologist
- Rebecca Clough (born 1988), Australian rugby union player
- Rebecca Cobb (fl. 2000s–2010s), British children's book illustrator
- Rebecca Codd (born 1981), Irish-Australian professional golfer
- Rebecca Cohn (born 1954), American politician in the California State Assembly
- Rebecca Cokley (born 1978), American disability rights activist
- Rebecca Cole (disambiguation), multiple people
- Rebecca Condie (born 1990), Scottish international field hockey player
- Rebecca Cooke (disambiguation), multiple people
- Rebecca Copin (1796–1881), known for attempting to poison her husband with arsenic
- Rebecca Copley (fl. 1980s–1990s), American soprano opera singer
- Rebecca Corry (born 1971), American comedian, writer, and actress
- Rebecca Costa (disambiguation), multiple people
- Rebecca Cotton (born 1974), New Zealand basketball player
- Rebecca Couch (1788–1863), American painter
- Rebecca Cox (disambiguation), multiple people
- Rebecca Craft (1887–1945), African American activist
- Rebecca Creedy (born 1983), Australian swimmer
- Rebecca Cremer (1924–2006), American alpine skier
- Rebecca Cremona (fl. 2000s–2010s), Maltese film director
- Rebecca Creskoff (born 1971), American actress
- Rebecca Lee Crumpler (1831–1895), American physician, nurse and author
- Rebecca Cryer (1946–2020), Oklahoma attorney, tribal officer, and judge
- Rebecca Cummins (fl. 2000s–2010s), American photographer and multi-media artist
- Rebecca Cunningham (disambiguation), multiple people
- Rebecca Curran (born 1986), Scottish journalist and presenter
- Rebecca Curtis (born 1976), American writer
- Rebecca Coleman Curtis (fl. 1970s–2010s), American author, psychologist, and psychoanalyst

== D ==
- Rebecca Da Costa (born 1984), Brazilian actress and model
- Rebecca D'Agostino (born 1982), Maltese football defender
- Rebecca Dallet (born 1969), American lawyer and a justice of the Wisconsin Supreme Court
- Rebecca Dalton (fl. 2010s), Canadian actress
- Rebecca Daly (born 1980), Irish film director, screenwriter and actress
- Rebecca de Pont Davies (fl. 2000s), British mezzo-soprano
- Rebecca Davis (disambiguation), multiple people
- Rebecca Nyandeng De Mabior (born 1956), South Sudanese politician
- Rebecca de Alba (born 1964), Mexican model and TV presenter
- Rebecca De Filippo (born 1994), Welsh rugby union player
- Rebecca De Mornay (born 1959), American actress and producer
- Rebecca De Unamuno (fl. 1990s–2010s), Australian actress and comedian
- Rebecca Del Rio (1931–2010), Filipino actress
- Rebecca Dempster (born 1991), Scottish footballer
- Rebecca DerSimonian (fl. 1970s–2010s), American statistician
- Rebecca Diamond (born 1967), contributor on the Fox Business Network and the Fox News Channel
- Rebecca Dickinson (1738–1815), American gownmaker
- Rebecca Dines (fl. 1980s–2010s), Australian actress
- Rebecca DiPietro (born 1979), American model and professional wrestler
- Rebecca Doerge (fl. 1980s–2010s), American researcher in statistical bioinformatics
- Rebecca F. Doherty (born 1952), United States District Judge for the Western District of Louisiana
- Rebecca Donovan (fl. 2010s), American novelist
- Rebecca Lee Dorsey (1859–1954), American physician and endocrinology expert
- Rebecca Dow (born 1973), American politician in the New Mexico House of Representatives
- Rebecca Dowbiggin (born 1983), 7th woman to cox Cambridge in The Boat Race, the annual race against Oxford
- Rebecca Drysdale (born 1970s), American comedian and writer
- Rebecca Dubber (born 1993), New Zealand para-swimmer
- Rebecca Dubowe (fl. 1990s–2010s), first deaf woman to be ordained as a rabbi in the United States
- Rebecca Duckworth (born 2000), English cricketer
- Rebecca Duncan (born 1971), Associate Justice of the Oregon Supreme Court
- Rebecca Dunham (fl. 2000s–2010s), contemporary American poet
- Rebecca Durrell (born 1988), British professional racing cyclist
- Rebecca Dussault (born 1980), American cross-country skier
- Rebecca Dwyer (born 1986), Australian field hockey player
- Rebecca F. Dye (born 1952), Commissioner of the Federal Maritime Commission

== E ==
- Rebecca Eames (1641–1721), accused of witchcraft during the Salem witch trials of 1692
- Rebecca Lane Hooper Eastman (1877–1937), American suffragist, journalist, and author of short stories
- Rebecca Eaton (born 1947), American television and film producer
- Rebecca Goodgame Ebinger (born 1975), United States District Judge for the Southern District of Iowa
- Rebecca Eckler (born 1973), Canadian writer of columns, blogs, and books about motherhood
- Rebecca L. Ediger (born 1952), United States Secret Service administrator
- Rebecca Ehretsman, American occupational therapist and academic administrator
- Rebecca S. Eisenberg (fl. 1980s–2000s), American lawyer and professor
- Rebecca Eisenberg (born 1968), American technology writer, lawyer, entrepreneur, and columnist
- Rebecca Elgar (fl. 1990s–2010s), English children's book illustrator and writer
- Rebecca Elloh (born 1994), Ivorian footballer
- Rebecca Elson (1960–1999), Canadian–American astronomer and writer
- Rebecca Emes (died 1830), English silversmith
- Rebecca Enonchong (born 1967), Cameroonian born technology entrepreneur
- Rebecca Evans (disambiguation), multiple people
- Rebecca Ewert (born 1955), New Zealand diver
- Rebecca Eynon (fl. 1990s–2010s), British educationalist specializing in the sociology of education

== F ==
- Rebecca Feldman (born 1982), Australian wheelchair racer
- Rebecca Latimer Felton (1835–1930), first woman to serve in the United States Senate
- Rebecca Ferdinando (born 1985), English actress
- Rebecca Ferguson (disambiguation), multiple people
- Rebecca Ferguson (singer) (born 1986), British singer and songwriter
- Rebecca Ferguson (born 1983), Swedish actress
- Rebecca Ferrand (fl. 1990s–2000s), film and television producer, line producer
- Rebecca Ferratti (born 1964), American model
- Rebecca Field (born 1990), English international lawn & indoor bowls player. Field was the 2013 World Indoor singles champion
- Rebecca Field (fl. 2000s–2020s), American actress
- Rebecca Fiorese (born 1980), Italian ice hockey player
- Rebecca Fisher (disambiguation), multiple people
- Rebecca Fitzgerald (born 1968), British medical researcher
- Rebecca Foon (born 1978), Canadian cellist, vocalist, and composer from Montreal, Quebec
- Rebecca Forstadt, American voice actress
- Rebecca Fortnum (born 1963), British artist, writer, and academic
- Rebecca Salome Foster (1848–1902), American missionary and prison relief worker
- Rebecca Franklin (1803–1873), English schoolmistress, founder of the Nant Glyn school
- Rebecca Franklin, Pittsburgh, Pennsylvania-based food writer for About.com, and various other media outlets
- Rebecca Franks (1760–1823), prominent member of loyalist society in Philadelphia, Pennsylvania during the American Revolution
- Rebecca Fransway (born 1953), American author and poet
- Rebecca Fraser (born 1957), British writer and broadcaster
- Rebecca Frayn, English documentary film maker, screenwriter, novelist and actress
- Rebecca Frazier (fl. 200s–2010s), American singer-songwriter, multi-instrumentalist, bluegrass musician and educator from Virginia
- Rebecca R. Freyre (born 1959), Judge of the Colorado Court of Appeals
- Rebecca Frith, Australian actress
- Rebecca Friedländer (1783–1850), German novelist and short-story writer
- Rebecca Fromer (1927–2012), American playwright, historian and poet
- Rebecca Front (born 1964), English actress, writer and comedian

== G ==
- Rebecca Gablé (born 1964), German author of historical fiction
- Rebecca Gabriel (born 1948), American contemporary realist painter and figurative artist
- Rebecca Gallantree (born 1984), British diver
- Rebecca Garcia (computer programmer), American computer programmer from New York City
- Rebecca Garcia (politician) (born 1973), Brazilian economist and politician
- Rebecca Garfein, a notable hazzan (also called cantor)
- Rebecca Gargano (born 1994), Italian fencer
- Rebecca Gayheart (born 1971), American fashion model and actress
- Rebecca George (born 1961),
- Rebecca Gergalo (born 2000), Finnish individual rhythmic gymnast
- Rebecca Gethings
- Rebecca Getzoff, American who worked for the KGB during World War II
- Rebecca Ghilardi (born 1999), Italian pair skater
- Rebecca Gibb, MW is a British journalist and Master of Wine based in England
- Rebecca Gibney (born 1964), New Zealand-born actress
- Rebecca Giddens (born 1977), United States slalom kayaker who competed from the mid-1990s to the mid-2000s
- Rebecca Giggs, Perth-based Australian nonfiction writer
- Rebecca Gilling (born 1953), Australian actress and environmentalist
- Rebecca Gilman (born 1964), American playwright
- Rebecca Gilmore (born 1979), Australian diver
- Rebecca Godfrey, novelist and non-fiction writer
- Rebecca Goldin, American mathematician
- Rebecca Goldstein (born 1950), American philosopher, novelist, and public intellectual
- Rebecca Gomperts (born 1966), doctor based in Amsterdam and is the founder of Women on Waves and Women on Web
- Rebecca E. Gonzales (born 1963), American diplomat who is a career member of the Senior Foreign Service
- Rebecca Goring (born 1994), Australian rules footballer with the Geelong Football Club in the AFL Women's competition (AFLW)
- Rebecca Goss (chemist), professor of organic chemistry at the University of St. Andrews
- Rebecca Goss (poet) (born 1974)
- Rebecca Gottesman, professor at Johns Hopkins University, specializing in neurology and epidemiology
- Rebecca Gould, writer, translator, and Professor of Islamic Studies and Comparative Literature at the University of Birmingham
- Rebecca Gowland, bioarchaeologist
- Rebecca Graeve (born 1993), German ice hockey player for EC Bergkamen and the Germany national team
- Rebecca Grant (born 1982), English actress and singer
- Rebecca Gratz (1781–1869), preeminent Jewish American educator and philanthropist in 19th-century America
- Rebecca Greenwell (born 1995), American basketball player
- Rebecca Greer (born 1936), American nonfiction writer and also served as an editor for Woman's Day magazine
- Rebecca Greiner (born 1999), Australian field hockey player
- Rebecca Grinter (fl. 1990s–2000s), professor at the Georgia Institute of Technology (Georgia Tech)
- Rebecca Grote (born 1992), German field hockey player, who plays as a midfielder
- Rebecca Grundy (born 1990), English cricketer and coach
- Rebecca Guarna, Italian physician, surgeon and author
- Rebecca Guay, illustrator of role-playing games, collectible card games, comic books, and children's literature

== H ==
- Rebecca Haarlow (born 1978), American sideline reporter
- Rebecca Hall (musician) (born 1965), American folk singer/songwriter
- Rebecca Hall (born 1982), English actress, producer, writer, and director
- Rebecca S. Halstead (born 1959), United States Army officer who was the first female graduate of West Point to become a general officer
- Rebecca Hamilton (politician) (born 1948), politician in the Oklahoma House of Representatives
- Rebecca Hampton (born 1973), French actress and television presenter
- Rebecca Handke (born 1986), German pair skater
- Rebecca Hankins, Africana Resources Librarian/Curator at Texas A&M University
- Rebecca Hanover (born 1979), American television writer and young adult author
- Rebecca Harms (born 1956), German politician who served as Member of the European Parliament (MEP) from 2004 until 2019
- Rebecca Flores Harrington (born 1940s), labor activist from Texas
- Rebecca Harris (filmmaker), British film producer
- Rebecca Harris (born 1967), British Conservative Party politician
- Rebecca Harrower (born 1996), Canadian synchronized swimmer, Harrower joined the national team in 2014
- Rebecca Hart (born 1984), para-equestrian from Pittsburgh, Pennsylvania
- Rebecca Hasson, American academic in the field of kinesiology
- Rebecca Hawkins, American pioneer woman
- Rebecca Haynes (born 1984), basketball player from Australia
- Rebecca Ross Haywood (born 1968), Assistant United States Attorney in the Western District of Pennsylvania
- Rebecca Naylor Hazard (1826–1912), 19th-century American philanthropist, suffragist, reformer, and writer
- Rebecca Hazelton (born 1978), American poet, editor and critic
- Rebecca Hazlewood, British actress
- Rebecca Heald, American professor of cell and developmental biology
- Rebecca Heflin (born 1963), women's fiction and contemporary romance novelist living in Gainesville, Florida
- Rebecca Heineman (1963–2025), American video game designer and programmer
- Rebecca Henderson (disambiguation), multiple people
- Rebecca Cohen Henriquez (1864–1935)
- Rebecca Hensler, founded the social media and internet support group "Grief Beyond Belief"
- Rebecca A. Herb (born 1948), American mathematician and professor emerita at the University of Maryland
- Rebecca Herbst (born 1977), American actress
- Rebecca Heyliger (born 1992), Bermudian swimmer
- Rebecca Hill (disambiguation), multiple people
- Rebecca Alban Hoffberger (born 1952), founder and director of the American Visionary Art Museum
- Rebecca Holcombe (born 1966), American educator and politician who served as the Vermont Secretary of Education from 2014 to 2018
- Rebecca Holden (born 1958), American actress and singer
- Rebecca Holloway (born 1995), professional footballer who plays as a midfielder for FA WSL club Birmingham City and the Northern Ireland national team
- Rebecca Hollweg (born 1964), English singer-songwriter
- Rebecca Honig, American voice actress
- Rebecca Horn (born 1944), German visual artist
- Rebecca Hornbrook (born 1975), atmospheric chemist at the National Center for Atmospheric Research (NCAR)
- Rebecca G. Howard (1829–1881), prominent black businesswoman in the early years of the Pacific Northwest
- Rebecca Lynn Howard (born 1979), American country music artist
- Rebecca Howard (born 1979), Canadian Equestrian Team athlete
- Rebecca Gayle Howell (born 1975), American writer, literary translator, and editor. In 2019 she was named a United States Artists Fellow
- Rebecca Hoyle, professor of applied mathematics at the University of Southampton
- Rebecca Hudson (born 1979), English professional golfer who plays on the Ladies European Tour
- Rebecca Hunter (born 1981), British actress and singer
- Rebecca Huntley (born 1972), Australian social researcher and expert on social trends
- Rebecca Huxtable (born 1981), British radio personality and producer
- Rebecca Hyland, British actress and voiceover artist
- Rebecca Immanuel (born 1970), German actress

== I ==
- Rebecca Indermaur, Swiss film and television actress
- Rebecca Isaacs (1828–1877), operatic soprano
- Rebecca Ivers, Australian academic in the fields of injury prevention and trauma care research

== J ==
- Rebecca Jackson (disambiguation), multiple people including:
  - Rebecca Jackson (presenter) (born 1982), English racing driver and television presenter
  - Rebecca Cox Jackson (1795–1871), free Black woman, religious activist and autobiographer
  - Rebecca D. Jackson (1955–2022), American medical researcher
  - Rebecca Jackson (politician), Republican politician from Louisville, Kentucky
- Rebecca James (disambiguation), multiple people
- Rebecca Jamieson, CM OOnt is a Canadian Tuscarora educator and education administrator
- Rebeka Jančová, (born 2003), Slovak alpine ski racer
- Rebecca Jarrett (1846–1928), English prostitute, procuress, and later reformer
- Rebecca Jarvis (born 1981), American journalist
- Rebecca Jasontek (born 1975), American competitor in synchronized swimming
- Rebecca Jauch, American politician
- Rebecca Jenkins (born 1959), Canadian actress and singer
- Rebecca Grady Jennings (born 1978), United States District Judge for the Western District of Kentucky
- Rebecca Jensen (born 1972), American professional tennis player
- Rebecca Jockusch, Ph.D. (UC Berkeley, 2001), Canadian chemist
- Rebecca Mammen John, Senior Advocate at the Supreme Court of India, and works primarily in the field of criminal defense
- Rebecca John (born 1970), presenter and reporter for Wales Today, BBC Wales on British television.
- Rebecca Johns (born 1971), author and educator
- Rebecca Johnson (disambiguation), multiple people
- Rebecca Johnston (born 1989), Canadian ice hockey player
- Rebecca Jones (disambiguation), multiple people
- Rebecca Jordan-Young (born 1963), American feminist scientist and gender studies scholar
- Rebecca Richardson Joslin (1846–1934), American writer
- Rebecca Joyce (born 1970), Australian rower
- Rebecca Richardson Joslin (1846–1934), American author, lecturer, benefactor, clubwoman
- Rebecca Judd (born 1983), Australian model, television presenter, and speech pathologist
- Rebecca Julian (born 1986), Australian table tennis player

== K ==
- Rebecca Kabugho (born 1994), Congolese activist who was detained by the government
- Rebecca Kadaga (born 1956), Ugandan lawyer and politician
- Rebecca Kalu (born 1990), Nigerian footballer
- Rebecca Kamau (born 1999), Kenyan swimmer
- Rebecca Kamen (born 1950), American artist
- Rebecca Kaplan (born 1970)
- Rebecca Masika Katsuva (1966–2016), activist and a survivor of sexual assault
- Rebecca Katz, professor and director of the Center for Global Health Science and Security at Georgetown University Medical Center
- Rebecca Kavaler (1920–2008), short story writer and novelist, was born in the U.S. state of Georgia
- Rebecca J. Keck (1838–1904), 19th-century woman physician and patent medicine entrepreneur and one of the wealthiest independent businesswomen in the Midwest
- Rebecca W. Keller, incorporated Gravitas Publications Inc in 2003 to develop and publish core sciences curriculum under the Real Science-4-Kids imprint
- Rebecca Kenna (born 1989), English amateur snooker and billiards player
- Rebecca Futo Kennedy, Associate Professor of Classics, Women's and Gender Studies, and Environmental Studies at Denison University
- Rebecca Keoghan
- Rebecca Kershaw (born 1990), British water polo player
- Rebecca Kiessling, American anti-abortion activist and attorney
- Rebecca Kilgore (born 1949), American jazz vocalist
- Rebecca Kilner, British evolutionary biologist, and a professor of evolutionary biology at the University of Cambridge
- Rebecca Ann King (born 1950), most noted as holder of the 1974 Miss America title
- Rebecca Rand Kirshner (born 1974), writer and producer for American television
- Rebecca Kislak (born 1972), American attorney and politician in the Rhode Island House of Representatives
- Rebecca Kiting (born 1991), Australian football (soccer) player
- Rebecca Kitteridge (born 1960s), director of the New Zealand Security Intelligence Service
- Rebecca Kleefisch (born 1975), American politician and television news anchor
- Rebecca Kohler, Canadian stand-up comedian
- Rebecca Love Kourlis (born 1952), Justice of the Colorado Supreme Court
- Rebecca Krohn, American ballet dancer
- Rebecca Kubacki, American politician in the Indiana House of Representatives

== L ==
- Rebecca Lacey (born 1965), English actress
- Rebecca Lake (disambiguation), multiple people
- Rebecca Lancefield (1895–1981), prominent American microbiologist
- Rebecca Lange, Professor of experimental petrology, magmatism and volcanism at the University of Michigan
- Rebecca Langlands, Professor of Classics at the University of Exeter
- Rebecca Langrehr (born 1998), German modern pentathlete
- Rebecca Hammond Lard (1772–1855)
- Rebecca Lardner (born 1971), English artist. Her parents were a gamekeeper and a postmistress
- Rebecca Lavelle (born 1980), Australian singer-songwriter
- Rebecca Louise Law (born 1980), British installation artist
- Rebecca Lee (disambiguation), multiple people
- Rebecca Le'gon (born 1980), director and publisher
- Rebecca Lemp (died 1590), German woman accused of witchcraft and burned at the stake in Nördlingen
- Rebecca Lenkiewicz (born 1968)
- Rebecca Lepkoff (1916–2014), American photographer
- Rebecca Leslie (born 1996), Canadian ice hockey forward
- Rebecca Levene
- Rebecca Liddiard (born 1990s), Canadian actress
- Rebecca Lim (born 1986), Singaporean actress
- Rebecca Lingwood (born 1970), Provost and Professor of Fluid Dynamics at Brunel University London
- Rebecca Linton (born 1985), New Zealand swimmer
- Rebecca Llewellyn (born 1985), Welsh tennis player
- Rebecca Lobo (born 1973), American television basketball analyst and basketball player
- Rebecca Lock
- Rebecca D. Lockhart (1968–2015), American politician and Republican member of the Utah House of Representatives
- Rebecca Loebe (born 1983)
- Rebecca Lolosoli (born 1962), founder and matriarch of the Umoja village in the Samburu County of Kenya
- Rebecca Long-Bailey (born 1979)
- Rebecca Loos (born 1977), Dutch personal assistant, glamour model, and media personality
- Rebecca Lord (born 1973), French pornographic actress
- Rebecca Lowe (born 1980), English television presenter and anchor
- Rebecca Loyche (born 1979), American artist and curator
- Rebecca Lukens (1794–1854), American businesswoman
- Rebecca Luker (1961–2020), American actress, singer, and recording artist
- Rebecca Lunn, MBE FRSE FREng FICE is a Professor and Head of the Centre for Ground Engineering and Energy Geosciences at the University of Strathclyde. I
- Rebecca Lush (born 1972)
- Rebecca Lusterio (born 1989), Filipino actress. She won the Gawad Urian and FAMAS awards. She is now married to a Danish national and is currently living in Denmark
- "Rebecca Lynn", a song co-written by Skip Ewing and Don Sampson, originally recorded by Ewing on his 1990 album A Healin' Fire

== M ==
- Rebecca Ma, American businesswoman, socialite, and social media personality
- Rebecca McConnell (born 1991), Australian mountain biker
- Rebecca Jean MacDonald (born 1974), Canadian curler from Stratford, Prince Edward Island
- Rebecca MacDonald (born 1953), Canadian businesswoman
- Rebecca Macfie, New Zealand author and journalist
- Rebecca MacKinnon (born 1969), author, researcher, Internet freedom advocate, and co-founder of the citizen media network Global Voices
- Rebecca Macree (born 1971), professional squash player from England
- Rebecca Maddern (born 1977), Australian television presenter and journalist
- Rebecca Mader (born 1977), English actress
- Rebecca Madyson (born 1979), Maltese sport shooter
- Rebecca Mahoney (born 1983), rugby union footballer and referee
- Rebecca Makkai (born 1978), American novelist and short-story writer
- Rebecca Malope (born 1968), multi-award-winning South African gospel singer
- Rebecca Marino (born 1990), Canadian professional tennis player
- Rebecca Mark-Jusbasche (born 1954), head of Enron International
- Rebecca Marshall, noted English actress of the Restoration era
- Rebecca Martin (born 1969), American singer and songwriter from Rumford, Maine
- Rebecca Masisak (born 1957), CEO of TechSoup, a nonprofit organization that provides technical assistance to other nonprofits
- Rebecca Massey (born 1969), Australian film, television and theatre actress
- Rebecca Masterton, British Islamic scholar, educator, public speaker, academic, author, television presenter, and philosopher of the Shia Islam
- Rebecca Matlock (1928–2019), American photographer
- Rebecca May (born 2002), English footballer who plays as a midfielder for FA WSL club Manchester United
- Rebecca Mbithi, lawyer, accountant and corporate executive in Kenya, the largest economy in the East African Community
- Rebecca McClanahan (born 1951), Democratic Representative of the second district of the Missouri House of Representatives
- Rebecca McFarland, American actress
- Rebecca McGowan, British taekwondo practitioner
- Rebecca McKenna (born 2001), Northern Irish footballer
- Rebecca Mead (born 1966), English writer and journalist
- Rebecca Meder (born 2002), South African swimmer
- Rebecca Mehra (born 1994), American middle-distance runner
- Rebecca B. Mellors (1899–1989), educator
- Rebecca M. Meluch (born 1956)
- Rebecca Jackson Mendoza (born 1973), Australian actress, singer, and dancer
- Rebecca Mercuri, computer scientist specializing in computer security and computer forensics
- Rebecca Metz, American actress
- Rebecca Meyers (born 1994), Paralympic swimmer of the United States
- Rebecca Miano (born 1966), Kenyan lawyer and corporate executive
- Rebecca Mike, territorial level politician from Pangnirtung, Nunavut
- Rebeka Mikulášiková, Slovak basketball player
- Rebecca Miller (conductor) (born 1975), American conductor
- Rebecca Miller (disambiguation), multiple people
- Rebecca Miller (footballer) (born 1995), Australian rules footballer
- Rebecca Miller (singer), Canadian country music artist
- Rebecca Miller (born 1962), American filmmaker and novelist
- Rebecca Millett (born 1962), American politician from Maine
- Rebacca Minkoff, co-founder of the company, Rebecca Minkoff in 2005
- Rebecca Mir (born 1991), German model and a TV presenter
- Rebecca Mitchell (disambiguation), multiple people
- Rebecca Moesta (born 1956), author of several science fiction books
- Rebecca Momin (born 1947), Bangladesh Awami League politician and Member of Parliament
- Rebecca Moore (disambiguation), multiple people
- Rebecca Jo Morales (born 1962), American artist born in Torrance, California
- Rebecca More (born 1980), English pornographic actress and model
- Rebecca Morelle, a British science journalist, currently global science correspondent for BBC News
- Rebecca Morris (author), New York Times bestselling true-crime author and a TV, radio and print journalist
- Rebecca Morris (born 1969), abstract painter
- Rebecca Morse (disambiguation), multiple people
- Rebecca Morton (1954–2020), American political scientist. She was Professor of Political Science at New York University New York and New York University Abu Dhabi
- Rebecca Moses (born 1958), American fashion designer, illustrator, author based in New York City
- Rebecca Brewton Motte (1737–1815), plantation owner in South Carolina and townhouse owner in its chief city of Charleston
- Rebecca Moynihan (born 1981), Irish Labour Party politician who has been a Senator for the Administrative Panel since April 2020.
- Rebecca Mpagi (born 1956), Ugandan military officer and Aircraft Maintenance Engineer, who serves as the Director of Personnel and Administration in the UPDF Air Force. She is credited as the first female in Uganda to qualify as a military aircraft maintenance engineer
- Rebecca Muambo (born 1985), Cameroonian freestyle wrestler. She competed in the women's freestyle 48 kg event at the 2014 Commonwealth Games where she won a bronze medal
- Rebecca Mulira (died 2001), Ugandan women's rights advocate and social activist
- Rebecca Murray (born 1990), American Paralympic four-time gold medalist and wheelchair basketball player from Richfield, Wisconsin
- Rebecca Musser (born 1976), American author and activist. She was a wife of the late Fundamentalist Church of Jesus Christ of Latter Day Saints prophet Rulon Jeffs and escaped before bringing legal proceedings against the church

== N ==
- Rebecca Nabutola (born 1959), Permanent Secretary of Kenya's Ministry of Tourism and Wildlife
- Rebecca Nagle (fl. 2010s), queer, indigenous activist, writer and speaker
- Rebecca Nandwa (fl. 1980s–2010s), Kenyan writer
- Rebecca Ndjoze-Ojo (born 1956), Namibian politician and educator
- Rebecca Neaves (born 1997), Australian rules footballer
- Rebecca Nelson (disambiguation), multiple people
- Rebecca Newark (born 1999), British para-cyclist
- Rebecca Newman (born 1981), English soprano singer and songwriter
- Rebecca S. Nichols (1819–1903), American poet
- Rebecca Night (born 1985), English actress
- Rebeka Nirmali (1964–2014), Sri Lankan cinema, TV, and theater actress
- Rebecca Nolin (born 1983), English soccer coach and professional player
- Rebecca Northan (fl. 2000s–2010s), Canadian actor, improviser, theatre director, and creative artist
- Rebecca Nurse (1621–1692), accused of witchcraft and executed in New England during the Salem Witch Trials of 1692

== O ==
- Rebecca O'Brien (born 1957), BAFTA-winning film producer
- Rebecca Ohm, United States Air Force officer and fighter pilot
- Rebecca Joshua Okwaci, South Sudanese politician
- Rebecca Walo Omana (born 1951), Congolese mathematician, professor, and reverend sister
- Rebecca O'Mara (born 1977), Irish actress
- Rebecca O'Neill (born 1981), New Zealand association football player
- Rebecca Odes (born 1969), American media entrepreneur, author, and musician
- Rebecca Onie (born 1977), co-founder with Rocco J Perla of The Health Initiative
- Rebecca Oppenheimer (born 1972), American astrophysicist
- Rebecca Ore (born 1948), American writer
- Rebecca Dulcibella Orpen (1830–1923), 19th-century artist
- Rebecca Amuge Otengo (born 1966), Ugandan politician
- Rebecca Ott (born 1994), Australian-New Zealand professional basketball player
- Rebecca Otto (born 1963), American politician who served as State Auditor of Minnesota

== P ==
- Rebecca Paisley
- Rebecca R. Pallmeyer (born 1954), Chief United States District Judge for the Northern District of Illinois
- Rebecca Pan (born 1931), Hong Kong actress and singer
- Rebecca Pantaney (born 1975), English badminton player
- Rebecca Parchment (born 1982), beauty queen
- Rebecca Parkes (born 1994), New Zealand-born Hungarian water polo player
- Rebecca Parris (1951–2018), American jazz singer
- Rebecca Parrish (1869–1952), American medical missionary and physician in the Philippines
- Rebecca Patek, American choreographer and performance artist
- Rebecca Paul (born 1950s), currently the president and CEO of the Tennessee Lottery
- Rebecca Pavan (born 1990), Canadian female volleyball player
- Rebecca Pawel (born 1977), American high school teacher and author of mystery novels
- Rebecca Peake (born 1983), English female athlete who competed in the women's shot put
- Rebecca Pennell (educator) (1821–1890), American educator
- Rebecca Penneys (born 1946), American-born pianist of Russian-Jewish descent
- Rebecca Talbot Perkins (1866–1956), American businessperson, philanthropist, and activist
- Rebecca Perrott (born 1961), New Zealand swimmer
- Rebecca Todd Peters, feminist and Christian social ethicist
- Rebecca Peters, political advocate for gun control
- Rebecca Peterson (born 1995), Swedish professional tennis player
- Rebecca Pidgeon (born 1965), American actress, singer, and songwriter
- Rebecca Piekkari (born 1967), Finnish organizational theorist and professor
- Rebecca Pike (born 1971), British journalist
- Rebecca Pitcher (born 1972), American musical theatre actress
- Rebecca Podos, American author of young adult fiction
- Rebeka Poláková, Slovak actress, plays the lead role in 2025 film Perla
- Rebecca Pomroy (1817–1884), American nurse and philanthropist
- Rebecca N. Porter (1883–1963), American educator, author, journalist
- Rebecca Posner (1929–2018), British philologist, linguist and academic
- Rebecca Pow (born 1960), British Conservative Party politician
- Rebecca Minot Prescott (1743–1813), second wife of United States Founding Father Roger Sherman
- Rebecca Preston (born 1979), Australian triathlete
- Rebecca Price (disambiguation), multiple people
- Rebecca Prichard (born 1971)
- Rebecca Priestley, New Zealand academic, science historian, and writer
- Rebecca S. Pringle (born 1955), American teacher and trade union leader
- Rebecca Privitelli (born 1995), Australian rules footballer
- Rebecca Probert (born 1973)
- Rebecca Pronsky (born 1980), singer-songwriter from Brooklyn, New York
- Rebecca Protten (died 1780), Caribbean Moravian evangelist and pioneer missionary

== Q ==
- Rebecca Quick (born 1972), American television journalist/newscaster and co-anchorwoman of CNBC's financial news shows Squawk Box and On the Money
- Rebecca Quinn (disambiguation)

== R ==
- Rebecca B. Rankin (1887–1965), director of the New York City's Municipal Reference Library for thirty-two years
- Rebecca Rasmussen, American fiction writer
- Rebecca Rather, American pastry chef, restaurateur, and cookbook author
- Rebecca Rawson (1656–1692), heroine of the 1849 book Leaves from Margaret Smith's Journal, in the Province of Massachusetts Bay (by John G. Whittier)
- Rebecca Raybould (born 1998), British female track cyclist
- Rebecca Raymer, American politician and nurse
- Rebecca Redfern (born 1999), British visually impaired para-swimmer
- Rebecca Reeve (born 1994), Australian female volleyball player. She is part of the Australia women's national volleyball team.
- Rebecca Reid, British actress and model
- Rebecca Reimer, American politician and a Republican member of the South Dakota House of Representatives
- Rebecca Hourwich Reyher (1897–1987), author, lecturer, and suffragist. She was the head of the New York and Boston offices of the National Woman's Party
- Rebecca Reynolds (disambiguation), multiple people
- Rebecca Rhynhart, American politician from Pennsylvania
- Rebecca Rice (1947–2002), in Washington, DC
- Rebecca Richards, Civil Liberties and Privacy Officer at the National Security Agency
- Rebecca Richards-Kortum (born 1964), American bioengineer and the Malcolm Gillis University Professor at Rice University
- Rebecca Pillai Riddell, Canadian clinical psychologist and a basic-behavioural scientist
- Rebecca Rigg (born 1967), Australian actress
- Rebecca Riggs, Australian actress
- Rebecca W. Rimel (born 1951), president and CEO of The Pew Charitable Trusts
- Rebecca Rimmington (born 1983), English sportsperson, a competitive cyclist
- Rebecca Ringquist (born 1949), Brooklyn-based visual artist
- Rebecca Rios (born 1967), American Democratic politician in the Arizona State Senate
- Rebecca Rippon (born 1978), Australian water polo player
- Rebecca Rippy (born 1977)
- Rebecca Rittenhouse (born 1988), American actress
- Rebecca Ritters (born 1984), Australian journalist
- Rebecca Rivera (born 1995), Filipino-Canadian volleyball athlete
- Rebecca Rixon (born 2000), Maltese international lawn bowler
- Rebecca Roache, British philosopher and lecturer
- Rebecca Roanhorse (born 1971), American science fiction and fantasy writer
- Rebecca Roberts (born 1970), American journalist
- Rebecca Robinson (disambiguation), multiple people
- Rebecca Robisch (born 1988), German triathlete
- Rebecca Roche (born 1965), association football goalkeeper
- Rebecca Roeber (1958–2019), American politician
- Rebecca Rolfe, popularly known as Pocahontas
- Rebecca Rolfe (cricketer) (born 1986), Irish cricketer
- Rebecca Rolls (born 1975), New Zealand cricketer and association footballer
- Rebecca Romero (born 1980), English sportswoman
- Rebecca Romijn (born 1972), American actress and model
- Rebecca Root (born 1969), English actress, comedian and voice coach
- Rebecca Rose (born 1980), American sculptor
- Rebecca Rosenblum (born 1978), Canadian author
- Rebecca Rusch (born 1968), American ultra endurance pro athlete
- Rebecca Rush (1779–1850), American writer
- Rebecca Russo (born 1994), American-born women's ice hockey player
- Rebecca de Ruvo (born 1969), Swedish TV presenter, actress, artist and model
- Rebecca Ryan (born 1991), English actress

== S ==
- Rebecca Saire (born 1963), British actress and writer
- Rebecca Saldaña, American politician in the Washington State Senate
- Rebecca Salter (born 1955), British abstract artist
- Rebecca Sandefur, American sociologist
- Rebecca Sanders (born 1982), Australian field hockey player
- Rebecca Santhosh (born 1998), Indian film and television actress
- Rebecca Sarker (born 1975), English actress
- Rebecca Sattin (born 1980), Australian rower
- Rebecca Saunders (born 1967), London-born composer
- Rebecca Scattergood Savery (1770–1855), American quilter
- Rebecca Saxe, professor of cognitive neuroscience
- Rebecca Schaeffer (1967–1989), American model and actress
- Rebecca Scheiner, German stage director of operas and musicals
- Rebecca Scheja (born 1989), Swedish actor, disc jockey, singer, songwriter and record producer
- Rebecca Scherm, American author
- Rebecca Schiffman (born 1982), singer-songwriter, jewelry designer, and visual artist
- Rebecca Schroeter (1751–1826), amateur musician
- Rebecca Schull (born 1929), American stage, film and television actress
- Rebecca Schulz, Canadian politician in the Alberta Legislature
- Rebecca Scott (disambiguation), multiple people
- Rebecca Scown (born 1983), professional rower from New Zealand
- Rebecca Scroggs (born 1982), English actress
- Rebecca Seal, American magazine editor and freelance journalist
- Rebecca Seawright (born 1962), member of the New York State Assembly
- Rebecca Seiferle, American poet
- Rebecca Selkirk (born 1993), South African chess player
- Rebecca Senf (born 1972), American writer and curator
- Rebecca Shanahan, New South Wales-based artist and arts educator
- Rebecca Sharp (disambiguation), multiple people
- Rebecca Shaw (disambiguation), multiple people
- Rebecca Shearing (born 1992), Scottish pop singer
- Rebecca Shelley (1887–1984), pacifist who lost American citizenship when she married a German national
- Rebecca Shipley, British mathematician and professor of healthcare engineering
- Rebecca Shoichet (born 1975), Canadian voice actress and singer
- Rebecca Shorten (born 1993), British rower
- Rebecca Simonsson (born 1985), Swedish singer, designer, glamour model, TV-host and blogger
- Rebecca Simpson (born 1982), association football player who represented New Zealand at international level
- Rebecca Sinclair (disambiguation), multiple people
- Rebecca Singh (born 1975)
- Rebecca Sjöwall, American opera singer and recording artist
- Rebecca Skloot (born 1972), American science writer who specializes in science and medicine
- Rebeccah Slater, British neuroscientist and academic
- Rebecca Slaughter (born c. 1983), acting chair of the U.S. Federal Trade Commission
- Rebecca Smart (born 1976), Australian actress
- Rebecca Smith (disambiguation), multiple people
- Rebecca Snyder (disambiguation), multiple people
- Rebecca Sockbeson (born 1972), Wabanaki scholar and activist
- Rebecca Soler, American voice actress based in the New York City area
- Rebecca Solnit (born 1961), American writer
- Rebecca Solomon (1832–1886), 19th-century English Pre-Raphaelite draftsman, illustrator, engraver, and painter of social injustices
- Rebecca Soni (born 1987), American competition swimmer
- Rebecca Sorensen (born 1972), American skeleton racer
- Rebecca Sowden (born 1981), association football player for New Zealand
- Rebecca Spence (triathlete) (born 1988), New Zealand triathlete
- Rebecca Spence, American actress
- Rebecca Spencer (singer) (born 1960), American singer and actress
- Rebecca Spencer (born 1991), English female football goalkeeper for FA WSL club Tottenham Hotspur
- Rebecca Spikings-Goldsman (died 2010), American film producer and filmmaker
- Rebecca Spindler, head of science and conservation at non-profit conservation organisation Bush Heritage Australia
- Rebecca Buffum Spring (1811–1911), Quaker abolitionist, educational reformer, feminist, and women's suffrage activist
- Rebecca Ruter Springer (1832–1904), American author
- Rebecca Šramková (born 1996), Slovak tennis player
- Rebecca St. James (born 1977), Australian Christian pop rock singer-songwriter and actress
- Rebecca Staab (born 1961), American actress
- Rebecca Starford, Australian author
- Rebecca Staffelli (born 1998), Italian television presenter, radio personality and model
- Rebecca Stead (born 1968), American writer of fiction for children and teens
- Rebecca Steele (disambiguation), multiple people
- Rebecca Stenberg (born 1992), Swedish ice hockey player
- Rebecca Stephens (disambiguation), multiple people
- Rebecca Stevens (disambiguation), multiple people
- Rebecca Stirm (born 1993), Belizean fashion designer
- Rebecca Stokell (born 2000), Irish cricketer
- Rebecca Storm (born 1958), British singer and musical theatre actress
- Rebecca Stott (born 1964)
- Rebecca Strickson, illustrator and designer
- Rebecca Strong (1843–1944), English nurse who pioneered preliminary training for nurses
- Rebecca Sugar (born 1987), American animator, director, screenwriter, producer, and singer-songwriter
- Rebecca Sullivan (born 1972), Australian judoka
- Rebecca Summerton, Australian filmmaker
- Rebecca Surman, American theoretical physicist
- Rebecca Sweetman, professor of ancient history and archaeology at the University of St Andrews
- Rebecca Swift (1964–2017), British poet and essayist
- Rebecca Wragg Sykes, British Paleolithic archaeologist, broadcaster, popular science writer and author

== T ==
- Rebecca Taichman, American theatre director
- Rebecca Talen (born 1993), Dutch professional racing cyclist. She is the daughter of the cyclist John Talen
- Rebecca Tarbotton (1973–2012), Canadian environmental, human rights, and food activist
- Rebecca Reichmann Tavares, worked in the field of development, race relations, and women's rights
- Rebecca Tavo (born 1983), Australian, dual international, rugby union and Touch football player
- Rebecca Taylor (politician) (born 1975), British health researcher and Liberal Democrat politician
- Rebecca Stiles Taylor (1879–1958), American journalist, social worker, and educator
- Rebecca Taylor (born 1969), New Zealand-born fashion designer based in New York City, United States
- Rebecca Tegg (born 1985), association football player who represented New Zealand at international level
- Rebecca Thomas (born 1984), American filmmaker and television director
- Rebecca Thompson, American physicist, popular science writer and head of the Office of Education and Public Outreach at Fermilab
- Rebecca Vega Thurber, American microbial ecologist and coral reef scientist
- Rebecca Harrell Tickell (born 1980), producer, director, actress, singer, and environmental activist
- Rebecca bat Meir Tiktiner, Yiddish writer
- Rebecca Tobey (born 1948), American artist from Santa Fe, New Mexico, who creates ceramic, brass, and patina animal sculptures in both modern and abstract styles
- Rebecca Tobin (born 1988), American professional basketball player
- Rebecca Toolan (born 1939), American television actress
- Rebecca Tope (born 1964), British crime novelist and journalist
- Rebecca Torr (born 1990), snowboarder from New Zealand
- Rebecca Traister (born 1975), American author and columnist
- Rebecca Travers (1609–1688), born in 1609, the daughter of a Baptist named Booth, and studied the Bible from the age of six
- Rebecca Trehearn, actress
- Rebecca Treiman, American psychologist
- Rebecca Trethowan (born 1985), female rugby union player
- Rebecca Tsosie, American jurist
- Rebecca C. Tuite, British author based in Los Angeles
- Rebecca Tunney (born 1996), British artistic gymnast who competed at the 2012 Summer Olympics
- Rebecca Turner, British swimmer
- Rebecca Tushnet (born 1973), law professor at Harvard Law School
- Rebecca Twigg (born 1963), American racing cyclist

== V ==
- Rebecca Valadez (fl. 1990s–2000s), American singer and actress
- Rebecca Newbold Van Trump (1839–1935), American painter of portraits and miniatures
- Rebecca Van Asch (born 1988), Australian Lawn bowler
- Rebecca van der Vegt (born 1964), association football player
- Rebecca Vassarotti (born 1972), member of parliament in the Australian Capital Territory Legislative Assembly
- Rebecca Vigil-Giron (born 1954), American politician who served as the Secretary of State of New Mexico
- Rebecca Vincent (born 1983), American journalist and human rights activist
- Rebecca Vint (born 1992), Canadian-born women's ice hockey player

== W ==
- Rebecca Waldecker (born 1979), German mathematician specializing in group theory
- Rebecca Walker (disambiguation), multiple people
- Rebecca Wallace-Segall, journalist and the founding executive director of Writopia Lab
- Rebecca Walter (born 1987), Australian volleyball player
- Rebecca Walton (born 1958), regional director of the British Council
- Rebecca Wanzo (born 1975), American academic
- Rebecca Ward (born 1990), American sabre fencer
- Rebecca Wardell (born 1977), New Zealand athlete who competes in the combined events
- Rebecca Warren (born 1965), British visual artist and sculptor
- Rebecca Watson (born 1980), American blogger and podcast host
- Rebecca Watts (born 1983), British poet
- Rebecca Norris Webb (born 1956), American photographer
- Rebecca Webster (born 2000), Australian rules footballer with the Geelong Football Club in the AFL Women's (AFLW)
- Rebecca Wee, American poet, and associate professor of creative writing
- Rebecca Weintraub (1873–1952), actress in the Yiddish theater who was born in Odessa, Russian Empire
- Rebecca Welch (born 1980s), English football referee
- Rebecca Welles (1928–2017), American television and film actress
- Rebecca Wells (born 1953), American author, actor, and playwright
- Rebecca West (1892–1983), British author, journalist, literary critic, and travel writer
- Rebecca Wheatley (born 1965), British actress and musician
- Rebecca Whisnant, professor and chair of the philosophy department at the University of Dayton
- Rebecca White (born 1983), Australian politician in the Tasmanian parliament
- Rebecca White (Vermont politician), American politician in the Vermont House of Representatives
- Rebecca Wiasak (born 1984), Australian track cyclist
- Rebecca Wigfield (born 1988), English international bowls player
- Rebecca Wilcox (born 1980), English television presenter, mainly for the BBC
- Rebecca Willett, American statistician and computer scientist
- Rebecca Williams (disambiguation), multiple people
- Rebecca Willis (born 1972), professor of practice at University of Lancaster
- Rebecca Wilson (curator), art curator and editor
- Rebecca Wilson (1961–2016), Australian sports journalist, radio and television broadcaster and personality
- Rebecca Win (born 1986), Burmese singer and model
- Rebecca Winckworth, Irish singer
- Rebecca Wing (born 1992), British artistic gymnast from Farnborough, Hampshire
- Rebecca Winters (pioneer) (1799–1852), Mormon pioneer who with her family left the eastern United States to emigrate to the Salt Lake Valley with other Latter-day Saints
- Rebecca Winters (1940–2023), for Harlequin Enterprises Ltd
- Rebecca Wirfs-Brock (born 1953), American software engineer
- Rebecca Wisocky (born 1971), American film, television and stage actress
- Rebecca Wittmann (born 1970), historian, writer, and professor
- Rebecca Wolff (born 1967), poet, fiction writer, and editor
- Rebecca Anne Womeldorf, American lawyer and Reporter of Decisions of the United States Supreme Court
- Rebecca Womersley (born 1993), English professional racing cyclist
- Rebecca Worthley (born 1981)
- Rebecca N. Wright (born 1967), American computer scientist
- Rebecca Wright (1947–2006), American ballerina, teacher, choreographer and ballet school director

== Y ==
- Rebecca Ynares (born 1949), Filipina politician
- Rebecca Young (disambiguation)
- Rebecca Yarros

== Z ==
- Rebecca Zadig (born 1982), Swedish singer
- Rebecca Zahau (1979–2011), American female murder victim
- Rebecca Zanetti (fl. 1990s–2010s), American author in various romance genres
- Rebecca Zhu (born 1987), Chinese-born Hong Kong actress and a beauty pageant titleholder
- Rebecca Zlotowski (born 1980), French film director and screenwriter
- Rebecca Zorach (born 1969), American art historian and professor
- Rebecca Zwick (fl. 1990s–2010s), researcher in educational assessment and psychometrics

== Fictional characters ==
- Rebeca Arthur, character in the TV series Perfect Strangers
- Rebecca Banner, mother of Bruce Banner (aka the Hulk) in Marvel Comics
- Rebecca Bishop (disambiguation), multiple characters
- Rebecca Bluegarden, the main female protagonist from the manga and anime series, Edens Zero
- Rebecca Bois, a character in the TV series Better Call Saul
- Rebecca Bowman (disambiguation), multiple characters
- Rebecca Bunch, main character of the CW series Crazy Ex-Girlfriend, portrayed by Rachel Bloom
- Rebecca "Becky" Connor, character in the ABC sitcom Roseanne
- Rebecca "Becky" Donaldson-Katsopolis, from the ABC sitcom Full House and Netflix series Fuller House
- Rebecca Harper, character on the ABC series Brothers & Sisters, portrayed by Emily VanCamp
- Rebecca Hotchkiss, character on the NBC/DirecTV daytime drama Passions
- Rebecca Howe, character on the NBC sitcom Cheers, portrayed by Kirstie Alley
- Rebecca Anne "Annie" January, character from the comic and TV franchise The Boys, portrayed by Erin Moriarty
- Rebecca Napier, character from the Australian soap opera Neighbours, portrayed by Jane Hall
- Rebecca Jane Nash (née Fisher), character from the Australian soap opera Home and Away
- Rebecca von Lahnstein, character on the German soap opera Verbotene Liebe (Forbidden Love)
- Rebecca Pearson (née Malone), main protagonist of the NBC drama This Is Us, portrayed by Mandy Moore.
- Rebecca 'Becky' Sharp, anti-heroine in the 1847 novel Vanity Fair and its adaptations
- Rebecca Sutter, character from the ABC legal thriller How to Get Away with Murder, portrayed by Katie Findlay
- Rebecca Sutter, alias of Pamela Rebecca Barnes on the reboot of Dallas
- Rebecca Rabbit, from the British children's series Peppa Pig
- Rebecca "Revy" Lee, main character from the manga and anime series, Black Lagoon
- Rebecca Randall, character from the manga and anime series Dragonar Academy
- Rebecca Scarlet, character from the manga and anime series Black Clover
- Rebecca "Becky" Thatcher, a main character in Mark Twain's The Adventures of Tom Sawyer
- Rebecca, character from the anime series Cyberpunk: Edgerunners
- Rebecca, character from the manga and anime series, One Piece
- Rebecca, a large anthropomorphic train in the British children's TV show Thomas & Friends
- Rebecca, a character in Fire Emblem: The Blazing Blade

== See also ==
- Rebecca, biblical figure
- Rebecca (disambiguation)
