= Rebecca Berg =

Rebecca Berg may refer to:

- Jenna K. Moran (born 1972), previously Rebecca Sean Borgstrom, American role-playing game writer
- Rebecca Buckley (born 1933), American scientist
