= Rebecca Campbell =

Rebecca Campbell may refer to:

- Rebecca Campbell (author) (born 1975), Canadian author, winner of the Ursula K. Le Guin Prize 2022.
- Rebecca Campbell (educator) (born 1969), professor of psychology at Michigan State University
- Rebecca Campbell (musician) (fl. 1980s–1990s), member of Canadian folk-rock band Fat Man Waving
- Rebecca Campbell (scientist), American–New Zealand neuroendocrinologist
