= Rebecca Jackson =

Rebecca Jackson may refer to:

- Rebecca Jackson (politician), American politician from Kentucky
- Rebecca Jackson (presenter) (born 1982), British television presenter, racing driver, entrepreneur, and motoring journalist
- Rebecca Cox Jackson (1795–1871), married name Rebecca Jackson, African-American free woman; religious activist and autobiographer
- Rebecca D. Jackson (1955–2022), American medical researcher, medical practitioner and professor of endocrinology, diabetes and metabolism
- Rebecca Jackson Mendoza (born 1973), Australian actress, singer and dancer
- Becky Jackson, fictional character in Glee
