= Rebecca Betensky =

American statistician

Rebecca A. Betensky is a professor of biostatistics and chair of the department of biostatistics at New York University's School of Global Public Health. Previously, she was a professor of biostatistics at the Harvard T.H. Chan School of Public Health, where she directed the biostatistics program for the Harvard Clinical and Translational Science Center. She was also a biostatistician for Massachusetts General Hospital, where she directed the biostatistics core of the Alzheimer’s Disease Research Center.

== Education and career ==
Betensky studied mathematics as an undergraduate in Harvard College, graduating in 1987. She completed a doctorate in statistics at Stanford University in 1992. Her dissertation, supervised by David Siegmund, was A Study of Sequential Procedures for Comparing Three Treatments.

After postdoctoral studies at Stanford, she joined the faculty of Northwestern University in 1993. She returned to Harvard as a faculty member in 1994, recruited as part of a large National Institutes of Health-funded contract for Harvard to perform statistics for the AIDS Clinical Trials Group. She became associated with Mass General in 2007.

In 2018, she joined the faculty of New York University's School of Global Public Health as professor and chair of the department of biostatistics.

== Awards and honors ==
Betensky has been a fellow of the American Statistical Association since 2003, and an elected member of the International Statistical Institute since 2007. She won the Mortimer Spiegelman Award of the American Public Health Association in 2005. In 2023 Betensky was awarded Fellow of the American Association for the Advancement of Science.
