= Rebecca Young =

Rebecca Young may refer to:

- Rebecca Young (flag maker), flag maker during the American Revolution
- Rebecca Young (American politician) (1934–2008), Wisconsin politician and legislator
- Rebecca Young (Australian politician), Queensland legislator
- Rebecca Young (rugby) (born 1981), Australian rugby union and rugby league player
- Rebecca Jordan-Young (born 1963), American sociomedical scientist
