= Rebecca Mitchell =

Rebecca Mitchell may refer to:

- Rebecca Mitchell (character), Tamzin Outhwaite's character in Hotel Babylon
- Rebecca Mitchell (epidemiologist), American epidemiologist and member of the Georgia House of Representatives
