= Rebecca Campbell (educator) =

American professor and researcher

Rebecca Campbell (born 1969) is a University Distinguished Professor of Psychology at Michigan State University. She is known for her research pertaining to sexual assault and violence against women and children and the effects of treatment by law enforcement and medical staff on victims' psychological and physiological well-being. Campbell has been involved in criminal justice research on the investigation of Detroit's untested rape kits, wherein DNA evidence obtained in thousands of rape kits was left in storage and not analyzed. She has received numerous awards for her work including the Society for the Psychological Study of Social Issues Louise Kidder Early Career Award (2000), the American Psychological Association (APA) Early Career Award for Distinguished Contributions to Psychology in the Public Interest (2008), the APA Division 27 Council on Educational Program's Excellent Educator Award (2015), and the U.S. Department of Justice Vision 21 Crime Victims Research Award (2015).

== Biography ==
Campbell received her B.S. degree in psychology from the University of Illinois at Urbana–Champaign in 1991. She then went on to graduate school at Michigan State University, where she obtained her M.A. in ecological community psychology in 1993 and her Ph.D. in ecological community psychology in 1996. After graduating, she joined the faculty of the Department of Psychology at Michigan State University.

Campbell received funding for "The Sexual Assault Kit Initiative" from the Bureau of Justice. She has received other grants from the National Institute of Justice, National Institute of Mental Health, American Evaluation Association, and Michigan Department of Community Health. Campbell co-created the Rape Prevention and Education Model that provides social workers with guidelines on how to address factors that increase risk of sexual assault. She is the author of Emotionally Involved: The Impact of Researching Rape (2002), a book about the emotional effects of conducting research involving victims of traumatic events.

Along with teaching and research, Campbell has engaged in police department training in cities such as Houston, Texas, Detroit, Michigan, and Washington, D.C. She has also been involved in training initiatives of the International Association of Forensic Nurses.

== Research ==
Campbell has examined how mistreatment of sex crime victims by law enforcement and medical staff leads to secondary victimization. In "The Neurobiology of Sexual Assault", she discussed an incident where a woman tried to report a sex crime, but was discouraged by a detective who did not believe her story. Campbell's research team tracked sexual assault cases in six different communities over twelve years and found that 86% of the victims did not go through with prosecution. Their findings indicated that victims of sex crimes are often shunned by law enforcement. Overall, 90% of sexual assault victims experienced some aspect of secondary victimization, which left them feeling hopeless and with varying degrees of depression and anxiety. In 70% of cases, victims reported that law enforcement officers asked them what they had been wearing. In such cases, law enforcement officers may have had a preconceived idea that the victim provoked the attack. This tendency to blame the victim for the sexual assault may lead the victim to relive the experience of being traumatized. Campbell and colleagues also reported that 69% of the victims were discouraged from continuing with litigation, with 51% of the victims stating that law enforcement told them that the assault was not serious enough to pursue.

Campbell found that law enforcement officers tend to ask questions such as "Why didn't you fight back?", "Why didn't you scream?", or "Why didn't you call for help?". Her research found that many sexual assault victims went into tonic immobility, a neurobiological condition where the victim is in paralysis. Campbell refers to this as "fight, flight, or freeze". When in a traumatic situation, a person will usually fight or try to escape; however, in many cases the person may become immobilized and not know what to do. During a sexual assault, opiates are released in the body, which may lead the victim to feel emotionless and limp, as if their body were shutting down. These reactions may be misinterpreted by law enforcement; the victim may appear to not care and not be taking the situation seriously, which might lead detectives to close the case. In Campbell's research, law enforcement officials were reported to say things like "I know she's lying" or "her story doesn't add up." Campbell found that during a sexual assault the hormone cortisol is released, which affects the part of the brain responsible for memory and may explain why victims have a hard time recollecting what happened. In conducting research on the effects of stress on memory, she found that processes of memory consolidation helped victims to recall the events. That is, victims were better able to recall details after taking time to relax and reflect back on the events than when they were subjected to intense interrogation.

== Representative publications ==
- Campbell, R., Feeney, H., Fehler-Cabral, G., Shaw, J., & Horsford, S. (2017). The national problem of untested sexual assault kits (SAKs): Scope, causes, and future directions for research, policy, and practice. Trauma, Violence, & Abuse, 18(4), 363–376.
- Campbell, R., Pierce, S. J., Sharma, D.B., Feeney, H., & Fehler-Cabral, G. (2016). Should rape kit testing be prioritized by victim-offender relationship? An empirical comparison of forensic testing outcomes for stranger and non-stranger sexual assaults. Criminology & Public Policy, 15, 555–583.
- Campbell, R., Greeson, M., Fehler-Cabral, G., & Kennedy, A. (2015). Pathways to help: Adolescent sexual assault victims’ disclosure and help-seeking experiences. Violence Against Women, 21, 824–847.
- Campbell, R., Shaw, J., & Fehler-Cabral, G. (2015). Shelving justice: The discovery of thousands of untested rape kits in Detroit. City & Community, 14, 151–166.
- Campbell, R., Bybee, D., Shaw, J.L., Townsend, S.M., Karim, N., & Markowitz, J. (2014). The impact of sexual assault nurse examiner (SANE) programs on criminal justice case outcomes: A multi-site replication study. Violence Against Women, 20, 607–625.
- Campbell, R., Dworkin, E., & Cabral, G. (2009). An ecological model of the impact of sexual assault on women's mental health. Trauma, Violence, and Abuse, 10(3), 225–246.
- Campbell, R., & Wasco, S. M. (2000). Feminist approaches to social science: Epistemological and methodological tenets. American Journal of Community Psychology, 28(6), 773–791.
- Campbell, R., Wasco, S. M., Ahrens, C. E., Sefl, T., & Barnes, H. E. (2001). Preventing the “Second rape” rape survivors' experiences with community service providers. Journal of Interpersonal Violence, 16(12), 1239–1259.
- Koss, M. P., Abbey, A., Campbell, R., Cook, S., Norris, J., Testa, M., ... & White, J. (2007). Revising the SES: A collaborative process to improve assessment of sexual aggression and victimization. Psychology of Women Quarterly, 31(4), 357–370.
