= Rebecca Steele =

Rebecca Steele may refer to:

- Rebecca Steele (cricketer), New Zealand cricketer
- Rebecca Steele (producer), Canadian film and television producer
- Rebecca Walker Steele, American musician and educator
