= Rebecca Snyder =

Rebecca Snyder may refer to:

- Rebecca S. Snyder (fl. 2010s), American appellate defense attorney
- Rebecca Snyder (sport shooter) (born 1976), Canadian-born American sport shooter
