= Rebecca Eynon =

British educationalist

Rebecca Elizabeth Eynon is a British educationalist specializing in the sociology of education. She holds a joint academic post at the Oxford Internet Institute and Department of Education, University of Oxford. She is a Senior Research Fellow and Associate Professor at the Oxford Internet Institute and she is a co-convenor for the MSc Education (Learning and Technology), at the Department for Education, University of Oxford. Her book Teenagers and Technology, Routledge, 2013 attracted coverage in the national press for its insight in to the nuances of how teenagers behave on the internet and the implications for teens without internet access.

== Education and career ==
She holds a degree in Psychology with Statistics from the university of London (1995) and a Masters in Mass Communications from the University of Leicester (1997), and a PhD from City University (2003). Her dissertation was titled The use of the World Wide Web in teaching and learning in higher education: a case study approach.

Before joining Oxford University, she held senior research positions at City University, the University of Birmingham and the University of Leicester. Eynon also held a Mid-Career Fellowship from the British Academy (2013–2014) for her research work exploring the links between internet use and social mobility in Britain.

She was elected a Fellow of the Academy of Social Sciences (FAcSS) in 2026.

== Books ==
Eynon is the co-editor with C. Davies of Education and Technology: Major Themes in Education, Routledge, 2015.

She is the co-author with Davies of Teenagers and Technology, Routledge, 2013.

== Editorial work ==
Eynon is one of three co-editors-in-chief of the journal Learning, Media and Technology.
