= Rebecca Bowman =

Rebecca Bowman may refer to:

- Rebecca Bowman, fictional character in Zoo (TV series)
- Rebecca Bowman, fictional character in Banshee (TV series)
- Rebecca Bowman, fictional character in Ninja: Shadow of a Tear
