= Rebecca Scott =

Rebecca Scott may refer to:

- Rebecca Scott (dancer), British ballroom and Latin dancer and choreographer
- Rebecca Scott (model) (born 1972), model and Playboy Playmate
- Rebecca J. Scott, American historian
- Beckie Scott (born 1974), Canadian cross-country skier
- Rebecca Scott (Shortland Street), a character in the New Zealand soap opera Shortland Street
- Rebecca Schroeter (born Rebecca Scott, 1751–1826), English amateur musician, wife of Johann Samuel Schroeter

== See also ==
- Rebecca Stott (born 1964), British writer
- Rebekah Stott (born 1993), New Zealand footballer
