= Rebecca Quinn =

Rebecca Quinn may refer to:

- Rebecca Quinn (cyclist) (born 1971), American cyclist
- Quinn (soccer) (born 1995), Canadian soccer player

== See also ==
- Becky Lynch (Rebecca Quin, born 1987), Irish professional wrestler
