= Rebecca Bluestone =

American artist and tapestry weaver

- Born: 1953; Elmore City, Oklahoma, U.S.
- Education: BA in Humanities, Oklahoma State University (1976)
- Occupation(s): Tapestry Artist, Yoga, & Pilates Teacher
- Website: https://rebeccabluestone.com/

Rebecca Bluestone is an American artist and studio trained tapestry weaver currently residing in Santa Fe, New Mexico. She studied with Nancy Lubin of Western Maine Weavers and contemporary Hopi weaver Ramona Sakiestewa. Rebecca passionately talks about the intersection of creativity and health. She has been an excellent tapestry artist since 1984, and she presents her work on a domestic and international level. Her work can be found in several museum collections including the Art Institute of Chicago, the Denver Art Museum, the Albuquerque Museum of Art and History, the New Mexico Museum of Art, and Museum of Arts & Design in New York.
