= Rebecca Bell =

American environmental education specialist

- Born: 1953 (age 72–73); United States
- Occupation: Environmental education specialist
- Known for: Embedding environmental issues into the State of Maryland's public school curriculum.

Rebecca Bell (born 1953) is an environmental educational specialist from Maryland, United States. Bell was a leader at bringing environmental issues to Maryland public school curriculum and has been honored as a Maryland Middle School Science Teacher of the Year. She has worked for the National Oceanic and Atmospheric Administration's Teacher at Sea program which works with scientists to monitor changes in ecosystems. In 2008, she served on the Delaware II, supporting NOAA and their research around long-term ecosystem trends. Bell also serves on Maryland Governor Martin O'Malley's Climate Change Commission.

In 2009 she was designated Women's History Month Honoree by the National Women's History Project.
