= Rebecca Gowland =

British bioarchaeologist

- Occupation: Bioarchaeologist

Academic background
- Education: Durham University
- Thesis: Age as an aspect of social identity in fourth-to-sixth- century AD England : the archaeological funerary evidence (2002)
- Doctoral advisor: Sam Lucy and Andrew Millard

Academic work
- Institutions: Durham University

Rebecca Gowland is a bioarchaeologist and a Professor of Archaeology at Durham University.

== Education ==
Gowland studied for an undergraduate degree at Durham University. She then completed a master's degree at the University of Sheffield before returning to Durham, where she completed her PhD in 2002.

== Career ==
After completing her PhD, Gowland undertook post-doctoral research at the University of Sheffield and University of Dundee. Gowland held a Junior Research Fellow at St John's College, Cambridge. She was appointed at Durham University in 2006 as a lecturer in Bioarchaeology. She was promoted to Associate Professor in 2017 and Professor in 2019.

She has received funding from the British Academy, and The Wenner-Gren Foundation. Gowland has been Associate Editor of the journal Antiquity since 2018. She is an Associate Editor at Bioarchaeology International, and the Treasurer of The Society for the Study of Childhood in the Past.

Her research interests include health and the life course in the Roman World, palaeopathology, social perceptions of the physically impaired and the inter-relationship between the human skeleton and social identity. Gowland has co-edited The Social Archaeology of Funerary Remains, with Chris Knüsel (2006) and The Mother-Infant Nexus in Anthropology (2020). Small Beginnings, Significant Outcomes (2019) with Siân Halcrow. She has co-authored Human Identity and Identification with Tim Thompson (2013).

== Selected publications ==
- Gowland, R.L., and A. G. Western. Morbidity in the marshes: Using spatial epidemiology to investigate skeletal evidence for malaria in Anglo‐Saxon England (AD 410–1050). American Journal of Physical Anthropology 147.2: 301–311.
- Gowland, R. L., Chamberlain, A. & Redfern, R. C. (2014). On the brink of being: re-evaluating infanticide and infant burial in Roman Britain. Journal of Roman Archaeology Supplementary Series 96: 69–88.
- Gowland, R. L. (2015). Entangled lives: Implications of the developmental origins of health and disease hypothesis for bioarchaeology and the life course. American Journal of Physical Anthropology 158(4): 530–540.
- Gowland, R. L. (2016). Elder abuse: evaluating the potentials and problems of diagnosis in the archaeological record. International Journal of Osteoarchaeology 26(3): 514–523.
- Gowland, R. L. (2017). Embodied Identities in Roman Britain: A Bioarchaeological Approach. Britannia 48: 175–194.
- Gowland, R. L., Caffell, A. C., Newman, S., Levene, A. & Holst, M. (2018). Broken Childhoods: Rural and Urban Non-Adult Health during the Industrial Revolution in Northern England (Eighteenth-Nineteenth Centuries). Bioarchaeology International 2(1): 44–62.
- Gowland, R., Stewart, N. A., Crowder, K. D., Hodson, C., Shaw, H., Gron, K. J., & Montgomery, J. (2021). Sex estimation of teeth at different developmental stages using dimorphic enamel peptide analysis. American Journal of Physical Anthropology, 174(4), 859-869.
- Gowland, R. L., Caffell, A. C., Quade, L., Levene, A., Millard, A. R., Holst, M., Yapp, P., Delaney, S., Brown, C., Nowell, G., Macpherson, C., Shaw, H. A., Stewart, N. A., Robinson, S., Montgomery, J., & Alexander, M. M. (2023). The expendables: Bioarchaeological evidence for pauper apprentices in 19th century England and the health consequences of child labour. PLoS ONE, 18(5), Article e0284970.
- Gowland, R. L. (2025). Skeleton matter(s): Reframing current approaches in bioarchaeology towards a more inclusive future. International Journal of Paleopathology, 51, 73-81.
- Gowland, R., & Halcrow, S. (Eds.). (2020). The Mother-Infant Nexus in Anthropology. Small Beginnings, Significant Outcomes. Springer Verlag. https://doi.org/10.1007/978-3-030-27393-4
