= Rebecca Cunningham =

Rebecca Cunningham may refer to:

- Rebecca Cunningham, a Disney character from TaleSpin
- Rebecca Miriam Cunningham, physician and president of the University of Minnesota
