= Rebecca Ayoko =

Togolese catwalk model

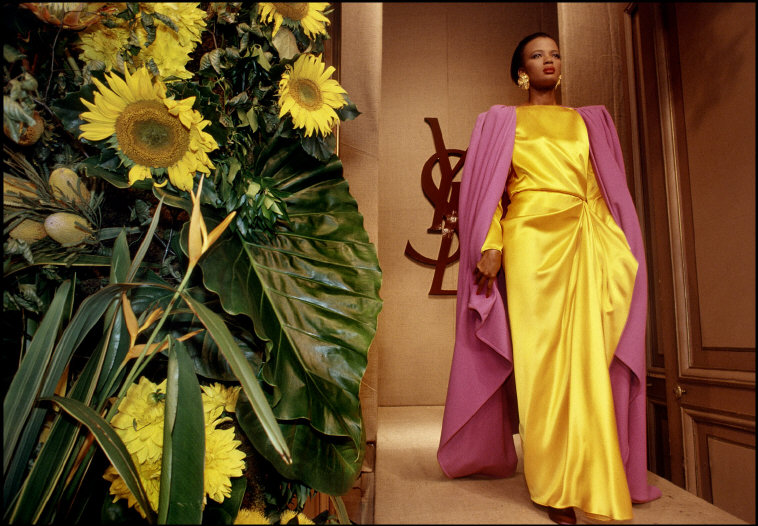
- Ayoko for Yves Saint Laurent, 1985
- Born: c. 1960; Agogo, Ghana
- Occupation: Model
- Children: 2

Rebecca Ayoko (born c. 1960) is an international catwalk model from Togo.

== Early life and career ==
Rebecca was born to Togolese parents in Agogo, Ghana, West Africa. She grew up in a poor family and suffered abuse during her childhood. Rebecca sold doughnuts as a child.

After appearing in advertisements for Kodak, Rebecca Ayoko went in 1980 to Paris, France, where she was noticed by Hachette Filipacchi's team. She also met Regis Pagniez, then director of Lui, and joined the Glamour model agency. She met with Yves Saint Laurent, and became one of the first few black models to walk at events in the mid-1980s. She worked as a model for the next decade. She became the face and star of different fashion shows. She got contracted to work for French luxury fashion house Yves Saint Laurent. After several years as the face of YSL, Rebecca was replaced by Katoucha Niane. In 2012, Rebecca published an autobiography entitled Quand les étoiles deviennent noires (When the stars turn black). The book was published by the French publishing house Jean-Claude Gawsewitch Éditeur. She dedicated her autobiography to her two children.
