= Rebecca Rasmussen =

American writer

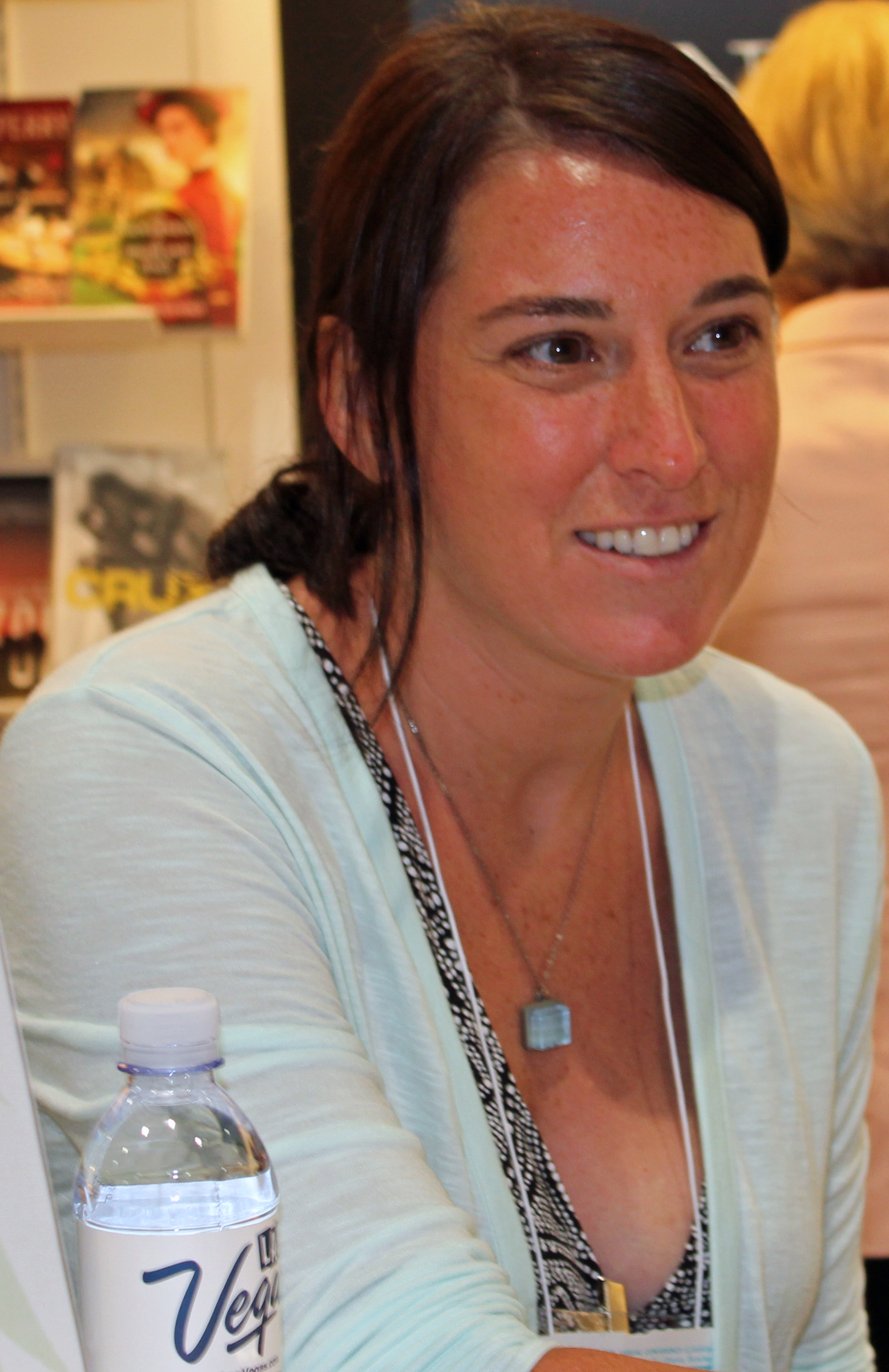
- Rasmussen in 2014
- Born: Highland Park, Illinois, U.S.
- Education: Colorado State University (BA); University of Massachusetts Amherst; Pennsylvania State University
- Children: 2
- Website: rebecca-rasmussen.com

Rebecca Rasmussen is an American fiction writer.

== Biography ==
Rasmussen was raised in Spring Green, Wisconsin. When she was very young, her parents divorced, with the result that she spent a considerable portion of her growing years in Northfield, Illinois. Rasmussen has four brothers.

Rasmussen began writing early. Her short stories have appeared in TriQuarterly and Mid-American Review magazines. She was a finalist in the 30 Below contest of Narrative Magazine. She was also a finalist in the Family Matters contest of Glimmer Train magazine.

Rasmussen received a BA degree from Colorado State University and Master's degrees from the University of Massachusetts Amherst and Pennsylvania State University. It was during the UMass coursework that she completed her first novel, which was published as The Bird Sisters two years later, on 12 April 2011.

Rasmussen has taught writing at Pennsylvania State University, University of Massachusetts Amherst, Fontbonne University, Washington University in St. Louis, and University of California, Los Angeles.

Rasmussen is married and has two children.

== Bibliography ==
The Bird Sisters (April 2011) 304 p. Crown, hardcover (9780307717962) Her second novel EVERGREEN, was published by Knopf in 2014 and was a BookPage Best Book of the Year. Represented by Michelle Brower, Aevitas Creative Management.
