= Rebecca Davis =

Rebecca Davis may refer to:

- Rebecca Harding Davis (1831–1910), American author and journalist
- Rebecca Fjelland Davis (born 1956), American novelist and children's book author
- Rebecca Davis (voice actress), American voice actress in Iczer Girl Iczelion
