= Rebecca Henderson (disambiguation) =

Rebecca Henderson is a Canadian actress.

Rebecca Henderson may also refer to:

- Rebecca M. Henderson, American economist
- Rebecca Henderson (cyclist), Australian mountain biker
- Rebecca Henderson (racewalker), Australian racewalker
