= Rebecca Nelson =

Rebecca Nelson may refer to:

- Rebecca J. Nelson, educator
- Rebecca Nelson, character in A, B, C... Manhattan
