= Rebecca Craft =

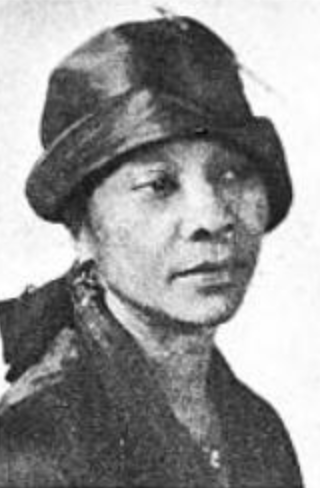
- Born: Rebecca Brown Wilson; June 4, 1887; Versailles, Kentucky, U.S.
- Died: December 6, 1945 (aged 58); San Diego, California, U.S.
- Occupations: Educator, community leader

Rebecca Brown Wilson Craft (June 4, 1887 – December 6, 1945) was an African American educator and activist who founded the Negro Women's Civic League in San Diego, California in 1934.

== Personal life ==
Rebecca Brown Wilson was born in Versailles, Kentucky. Craft was educated at the Kentucky Normal and Industrial Institute for Colored Persons (now Kentucky State University), a historically Black university.

After graduating, she taught in Kentucky and also did graduate work in Chicago. She moved to San Diego, California with her husband, John Craft, in 1910. While in San Diego Craft lived with her husband, her sister (Esther Streppe) and her sisters' sons (Thomas, Cecil, and Andrew). She died in 1945, at 58 years old, due to cancer.

== Career and civil rights work ==
In 1910 Rebecca Craft and her husband, John E. Craft moved to Logan Heights, San Diego, California. Rebecca was a retired teacher who had previously taught at various schools in Central Kentucky, one being an all-black school. Although Rebecca Craft was qualified for a teaching position since she had previous experience, she was unable to receive a teaching job in the city of San Diego. During this time majority of African Americans in the city before World War II were employed in a service or labor job. So instead of teaching, Rebecca Craft focused on improving the way of life in the African American community in San Diego.

Rebecca Craft founded many different community centers for African Americans in the city of San Diego. She founded the Baptist Young People’s Union, Logan Heights Young People’s Community Center, and the Negro Women’s Civic League. These community centers added meeting places, temporary housing and employment, network opportunities, safe places for African Americans, and places where the youth can be educated. The Negro Women’s Civic league is one of the most famous centers Rebecca Craft founded and it created a lot of benefits for the community. This center empowered Black women to initiate fundraisers for the community and the money that was raised went towards scholarships so African Americans could attend San Diego State University. Rebecca Craft contributed to the Civil Rights Movement in the following ways, by fighting for African American teachers to become employed even though she had been denied for such a position despite her experience and continuing to better African American communities in San Diego.

There are two famous African Americans in San Diego that Rebecca Craft help succeed. In 1937, Rebecca Craft and the Women’s Civic League, fought to have the first African American teacher in San Diego by campaigning. This fight would take years to win. Lorraine Van Lowe was one of those black students who benefited from the Women’s Civic League scholarships. She attended San Diego State University and graduated with a bachelor’s degree in English in 1933 and was hired as teacher as an adult education teacher for the San Diego Schools. Van Lowe left San Diego in 1939 to earn her master’s degree in personnel and guidance at Columbia University. Van Lowe returned to San Diego in 1941, the entire time she was gone Rebecca Craft had been campaigning to have a black teacher hired. The Women’s Civic League had sent four qualified black candidates to be hired but were denied. World War II had caused an increase of students in the school system and the city needed more teachers. Rebecca Craft understood there was a need for teachers and with her persistence on July 21, 1942 Lorraine Van Low was hired at Memorial Junior High. Rebecca Craft not only tried to advocate for more African American teachers to be hired but was very active in the Parent Teachers Association, worked for better school curriculum, and the removal of racially offensive literature from the school textbooks and libraries.

Rebecca Craft also pushed for equality in the San Diego Police department as well. Jasper Davis wanted to become a police officer for the city. There was only one black officer on the force at that time, John Cloud. Davis decided to take the qualifying test and placed twenty-fourth in it but was repeatedly passed over when he tried to make appointments to be hired. Jasper Davis then went to see the police chief, Chief Arthur Hill about it and he discouraged Davis and tried to push him away. Rebecca Craft who was an active NAACP member of the San Diego branch became very interested in the number of jobs African Americans could have in the city. Rebecca Crafter and Dennis Allen, president and founder of the San Diego Race Relations Society, went to see Chief Arthur Hill multiple times to convince him to hire other African Americans. The chief denied Rebecca Craft, so she wrote a petition went to churches, the city council, the mayor to have them sign it to put pressure against the police department. Rebecca Craft and others also called the police chief daily to try to get him to change his mind. This type of campaigning went on for over a year and a meeting took place at the African Methodist Episcopal Church and the mayor and chief of police were in attendance. At this meeting, Hugh McBeth a Los Angeles attorney gave a speech that changed the chief of police’s mind. On 3 March 1931 Jasper Davis was hired and operated radios for two and a half years and stayed on the police department for twenty-three years.
