= Rebecca Burlend =

British-American writer (1793–1872)

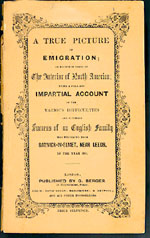
A True Picture of Emigration, 1848

Rebecca Burlend (1793–1872) is the author of A True Picture of Emigration, a journal and guide written during the period of 1831–1845. (The full title is A True Picture of Emigration or Fourteen Years in the Interior of North America Being a Full and Impartial Account of the Various Difficulties and Ultimate Success of an English Family Who Emigrated from Barwick-in-Elmet, near Leeds, in the Year 1831.) She published it anonymously in 1848, receiving credit for the work in 1936.

Rebecca and her John, a teacher and farmer, married in 1793. They and five of her seven children left their home in Barwick-in-Elmet, Yorkshire, England for Pike County, Illinois, in 1831. (A son and daughter, both employed, stayed in England.) When the Burlends arrived in New Orleans, Rebecca was shocked the city's nonobservance of the sabbath and the site of slaves yoked together for sale. The family traveled by steamer up the Mississippi River to St. Louis, and then the Illinois River to Phillips Ferry. Like many settlers arriving in the wilds of North America at the time, she and her family experienced numerous problems before finally achieving stability and success.

In 1846, Rebecca visited England and her son Edward wrote down her memories of her life. It was published anonymously in 1848. The pamphlet was republished under Edward Burlend's name in 1856 or 1857 as The Wesleyan Emigrants. Rebecca received credit for the work in 1936.
