= Rebecca Sinclair =

Rebecca Sinclair may refer to:

- Rebecca Sinclair (author) (fl. 1980s–2000s), American romance novelist
- Rebecca Sinclair (snowboarder) (born 1991), New Zealand snowboarder
- Rebecca Rand Kirshner (born 1974), writer and producer for American television
