= Rebecca Cooke (disambiguation) =

Rebecca Cooke is an American politician.

Rebecca Cooke may also refer to:

- Rebecca Cooke (swimmer) (born 1983), retired British swimmer
- Rebecca Cooke (footballer) (born 2002), Irish professional footballer
