= Rebecca Bossavy =

French handball player (born 1995)

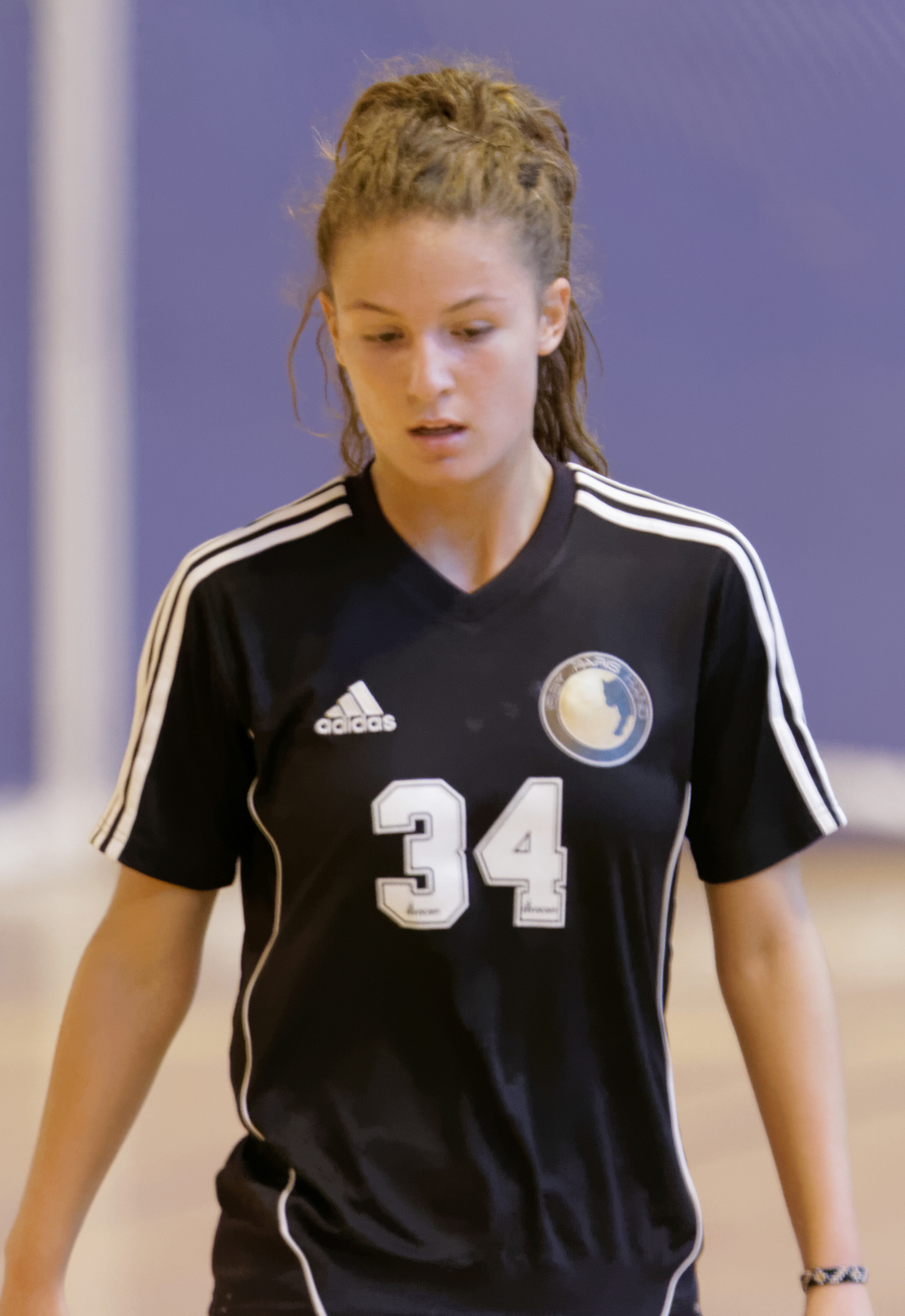
- Bossavy in 2014

Personal information
- Born: August 7, 1995 (age 31) Bobigny, France
- Height: 168 cm (66 in)

Sport
- Sport: Handball
- Position: Left wing
- Current club: Issy-Paris Hand
- Number: 34

Rebecca Bossavy (born 7 August 1995) is a handball player from France who competes for Issy-Paris Hand. Her team reached semifinals of the 2015/16 Cup Winners' Cup.
