= Rebecca Nabutola =

Kenyan politician

Rebecca M. Nabutola

Permanent Secretary, Ministry of Tourism and Wildlife

Personal details
- Born: January 17, 1959 (age 67)
- Education: Diploma in International Relations and Development
- Alma mater: University of Nairobi; Institute of Social Studies, The Hague
- Occupation: Civil servant

Rebecca M. Nabutola (born January 17, 1959) is the former Permanent Secretary (PS) of Kenya's Ministry of Tourism and Wildlife. Nabutola studied at the Institute of Social Studies, Hague, earning a diploma in International Relations and Development, and at the University of Nairobi, where she earned a Bachelor of Arts.
