= Rebecca Anweiler =

Contemporary Canadian visual artist

Rebecca Anweiler (born September 11, 1959) is a contemporary Canadian visual artist based in Kingston, Ontario. She has been exhibiting works in oil painting, new media and video since 2000. She has taught at Queen’s University at Kingston for 15 years. Most notably her works are in the collections of the Agnes Etherington Art Centre, the City of Toronto, and the University of Lethbridge.

== Early life and education ==
Rebecca Anweiler was born in Hamilton, Ontario on September 11, 1959.

Anweiler attended the University of Guelph for a Bachelor’s of Science. Studying biology, she did not originally study painting, but topics of biology, gender and sexuality that stem from this degree are common themes in her artistic practice.

She then moved to Toronto to attend the University of Toronto. She received a Master of Education from the Ontario Institute for Studies in Education (OISE) in 1994. Anweiler then attended the Ontario College of Art and Design (now OCAD University), where she received an Associates Degree in drawing and painting in 1997.

Specializing in painting, she later attended Concordia University in 2000 for her Masters of Fine Art. While attending Anweiler was awarded J. W. McConnell Memorial Fellowship.

== Artistic Practice and Influences ==
Much of Anweiler’s work is done in a photo-realistic style, or “soft photo-realism” as termed by the contemporary artist Jon Davies because Anweiler’s style “evokes not simulates her source photos,” which she derives from encyclopedias and textbooks produced through the 1950s. Many of her earlier works are grisailles, which David Jager compares to the artist Mark Tansey’s style. Anweiler’s style emphasizes the inherent symbolism in everyday imagery through the reproduction of these images. Through reproduction Anweiler calls attention to how social norms of the past continue to be recreated in the present.

Anweiler’s background in science and education are key influences in her artistic practice. Anweiler uses her artistic practice as a form of critique for Western science and colonialism, calling into question how inflexible mainstream scientific institutions are in terms of inexplicable phenomena often attributed to the supernatural. Anweiler holds these themes in relation to her concerns around the climate crisis. As seen in Anweiler’s exhibition I Wish You Were Here, wherein Anweiler painted a series of picturesque Canadian landscapes, she critically omits the infrastructure of the resource extraction industry which characterize many of those scenes today.

Anweiler’s work also seeks to investigate how understandings of human sexuality and sexual orientation emerge in scientific discourses around biological determinism and the natural world. Anweiler calls to attention how sexism, racism, and heteronormativity simultaneously structure the production of scientific knowledge around human biology and social mores around sex. Seen in the exhibition Sexual/Nature, Anweiler interrogates how the “normal” is constructed for sexuality. Specifically selecting images from educational sources, Anweiler’s work observes that images of the “natural” or “normal” are highly constructed to convey specific meanings around what is acceptable, such as the nuclear family, and what is made to be taboo, such as homosexuality.

== Key works ==
=== Passing Through ===
Passing Through is a collection of small oil on linen paintings, grouped in series. This exhibit was at the David Kaye Gallery in April of 2017.

Each image is blurry with movement, with cool blues, greens and greys dominating the frame as highlights of orange add interest to certain frames in the series. Anweiler does not fill the frame with her images, allowing the unprimed linen to act like an impromptu frame.

The content is derived from a visit to St. John’s, Newfoundland. Each painting is based on a still photograph taken from inside their vehicle: the landscape is blurred by the motion of their car. While Anweiler is referencing the speed at which contemporary lives move, in how with cars and technology we have access to places and information at a rapid rate, she also chose to represent these views to reflect her personal experience of travelling by car. She is also presenting the audience with the view that her sister, who is in a wheelchair, could access, as they spent the majority of the trip inside their car. The content continues Anweiler’s interest in nature imagery combined with social justice themes.

=== Animal/Séance ===
In 2017 Anweiler held a solo show at Modern Fuel Artist-Run Centre in Kingston, Ontario titled Animal/Séance.

The show explored animal intelligence, telepathic communication and spirituality through a photo installation, a video work and an interactive computer program in Modern Fuel’s State of Flux gallery, which is a space designed for locally-based emerging or mid-career artists to show their work.

This show contained an “experiment,” about the potential psychic connection between the dead pets chosen for the show and gallery goers. This experiment led participants to spiritually connect with one of the animals, which were deceased pets from the Kingston area, and then measure their connection objectively through the program’s database of information about each pet. The goal of the experiment was to observe whether participants truly did communicate with the spirits of the deceased animals by how much information they knew about the animal.

=== I Wish You Were Here ===
I Wish You Were Here, shown in 2012, is Anweiler’s second exhibition at the David Kaye Gallery.

In this series Anweiler painted a set of 24 idyllic landscapes of Canadian wilderness reminiscent of the iconic landscapes produced by historic Canadian painters, the Group of Seven. These images express a deeper meaning, as indicated by Anweiler, that the images are false representations of the land in that they do not show the destruction the land has undergone from resource extraction industries, nor do they show the people who live on these lands. R.M. Vaughan, art critic for the Globe and Mail writes on Anweiler’s exhibition saying:

“Anweiler’s new nature landscapes present an idyllic Canada, one that we can, increasingly, only view through a creative lens. Despite their forthright prettiness, however, Anweiler’s aggressive, choppy brushstrokes convey a marked rage.”

=== Manifestations of a Different Nature ===
Manifestations of a Different Nature is one of three exhibitions Anweiler has had displayed in the David Kaye Gallery in Toronto.

Debuting in 2008, this collection emphasizes many recurring themes in Anweiler’s artistic practice such as the connections between science and mysticism, as well as the conflict between nature and modernity. In each of the 21 paintings the canvas is split between one monochromatic image of an animal or occasionally a human figure and one image of scenery in colour. Anweiler writes that the series tries to “establish the paranormal as part of nature.”

=== Nature Lover ===
The 2006 exhibition Nature Lover at the Katherine Mulherin Contemporary Art Projects was initially shown under the title Sexual/Nature at Maison de la Culture du Plateau-Mont-Royal in Montréal, Québec in 2005.

Partially inspired by Paul Vasey, a professor of psychology at the University of Lethbridge whose field of research includes animal homosexuality, the exhibition depicts a range of found photography of animals in nature from National Geographic magazines, lesbian pornography from On Our Backs, the first woman run pornographic magazine, and film stills from notable Hollywood movies during the Hays Code era. These images were cropped, combined, and reproduced as paintings in the series. One intention of the series is to call to attention how reductive scientific and societal understandings of sexual diversity are, as Anweiler says:

“[On sexual diversity]...because it didn’t fit into the nice paradigm of evolutionary theory and heterosexual reproductive strategies they ignored it, or they called it unnatural.”

Also prevalent in the exhibition is a sense of nostalgia through the imagery itself and for the imagery of the 50s invoked through the films.

== Residencies ==
=== Department of Biological Flow ===
Anweiler took part in experimental artist collective Department of Biological Flow’s creative experiment “Channel Surf: Between Two Signals ~~~//~~~A Durational Event” in June 2015.

Described as “a paddling arts residency,” over the course of two weeks a group of community members—ranging from artists to activists—canoed, camped, and created along the Rideau Canal from Kingston to Ottawa.

The project dually looks at the geospatial context provided by passage along the canal, and the function of the canal as a channel from which information is transmitted along, with participants acting as “data packets.” Throughout this process, participants created art that explored their relationality between space, community, and information.

The project was broken down into five parts: “Act One: Toward an Eventual Energetics (Kingston)”, “Act Two, Scene One: Beginning in the Middle (Rideau Canal, Kingston)”, “Act Two, Scene Two: To Exhaust and Endure (Rideau Canal, en route)”, “Act Two, Scene Three: Fragility and Arrival (Rideau Canal, Ottawa)”, and “Act Three: Performing the Anarchive (Gallery 101, Ottawa).” In the final part of their project, participants performed an “anarchive” of their journey, which the collective defines as a performance that “seeks to share the affective tone of a process or event rather than relay strict chronologies or typologies of identification,” as well as embodying the continuity of creation instead of displaying a single art object.

=== Murmur Land Studios (MLS) ===
Anweiler took part in the one week MLS artist residency “Wander Lines: Mythodological Escapism,” in August 2017.

Dubbed “an experimental field school,” residencies held by MLS focus on creating educational and creative spaces beyond the classroom in order for participants to engage with how they are situated in the environment around them. Part of this process is the act of camping and community building that develops care between participants and care for the land. As each residency is different, Anweiler’s residency looks at the ontology of escapism and mythos as a form of knowledge production. Along with photographic documentation of the residency, Anweiler and other participants created a “co-generated textbook” detailing concepts, quotes, and ideas utilized during the residency.

=== Other exhibitions ===
One of Anweiler’s first exhibitions after completing her MFA at Concordia was Longing for Paradise at the Toronto based BUSgallery in 2000. This two-person show was alongside Guelph-based painter Pearl Van Geest. Their work both focused on topics of what is considered public and private as well as the subject of traditional femininity.

Anweiler participated in Art Shift at the Union Gallery in Kingston, Ontario. Located on the Queen’s University campus, the Union Gallery is student-centred and aims to support the education of young artists. Art Shift was a 2009 project that brought together artists from different generations, both emerging and established artists, who would work together in a creative exchange while providing professional development to participants. The exhibition “Conflux” happened at the end of the Art Shift project and was in the Union Gallery’s main space. The show featured one of Anweiler’s paintings entitled “Storm Bird II,” from Anweiler’s earlier exhibition Manifestations of a Different Nature.
