= Rebecca Robinson =

Rebecca Robinson may refer to:

- Rebecca Robinson (artist), American mixed media artist
- Rebecca Napier, also Robinson, fictional character from the Australian soap opera Neighbours
- Rebecca Robinson, American beauty pageant contestant, see Miss Texas' Outstanding Teen
- Rebekah Robinson (born 1995), Jamaican netball player
