= Rebecca Rather =

American chef

Rebecca Rather, known in the culinary world as "The Pastry Queen," is an American pastry chef, restaurateur, and cookbook author from Beaumont, Texas best known for her bakery café, The Rather Sweet Bakery, which was located in the Texas Hill Country.

Before she reached international acclaim, Rather headed the bakery side for Houston restaurateur Tony Vallone at Tony's, La Griglia and Grotto in Houston. She then moved to upstate New York to study artisanal breads. She returned to Texas to oversee the pastry side of Schlotzsky's Bread Alone Bakery. Aside from her commercial work, Rather has also taught baking classes at Houston's Central Market and The Rather Sweet Cafe.

== Restaurants ==
- The Rather Sweet Bakery, Rather's first restaurant that ran for 12 years and closed in 2012
- The Pink Pig Café, opened in 2012 and closed in 2013
- Sugar and Smoke, opened in 2012; co-owned with award-winning chef Nicole Davenport
- Rebecca's Table, opened in 2008, now closed
- Rebecca's Farmhouse, opened in 2016
- Emma + Ollie, opened 2019, Fredericksburg, Tx, now closed

== Books ==
Rather is the author of three best-selling and award-winning cookbooks, including a winner of the Julia Child Cookbook Award:

- The Pastry Queen, co-written with Alison Oresman, Ten Speed Press
- The Pastry Queen Christmas, Ten Speed Press
- Pastry Queen Parties, Ten Speed Press
