= Rebecca Williams =

Rebecca Williams may refer to:

- Rebecca Williams (actress) (born 1988)
- Becky Williams, labor unionist
- Rebecca Yancey Williams, inspiration for The Vanishing Virginian
- Rebecca Chase Williams, mayor of Brookhaven, Georgia
- Rebekah Williams (1950–2023), Nunavut legislator
