= Rebecca Reichmann Tavares =

American human rights activist

- Born: Rebecca Reichmann Tavares; Southern California, United States of America
- Occupations: UN diplomat promoting race relations and women’s rights
- Known for: Gender equality and Women's rights
- Notable work: Books titled Race in Contemporary Brazil: From Indifference to Inequality (1999) and Population and Reproductive Rights

Rebecca Reichmann Tavares, from Southern California, USA, has worked in the field of development, race relations, and women’s rights. She was the UN representative for Brazil and Regional Programme Director of UN Women’s Brazil & Southern Cone Office./ President and CEO of the Brazil Foundation, Interim Coordinator of the Every Woman Every Child (EWEC) Initiative of the UN Secretary-General, representative of the UN Women’s Office in New Delhi, and Interim Representative of UN Women in Afghanistan.

Tavares has written many books, reports, and papers related to the sociology of race relations in Brazil, rights, and entitlements of women, and microfinance in Latin America.

== Biography ==
Rebecca Reichmann Tavares is from Southern California. She graduated from the Yale University. She has a doctoral degree (Ed.D.) from the Harvard Graduate School of Education. Following her education, she worked at micro-finance organization Accion International for six years as Director of Training, Research, and Evaluation. After that, she spent six years in Rio de Janeiro, Brazil, as Program Officer at the Ford Foundation. In Brazil, she help fund emerging African Brazilian and women's rights organizations during the country's transition from a military regime to democracy. Back in California, USA she was Founder Vice President of the New Americans Immigration Museum and Learning Center, in San Diego.

From 2009 to 2013, she worked as the UN representative for Brazil and Regional Programme Director of UN Women’s Brazil & Southern Cone Office, and particularly engaged in issues related to race relations and woman's rights. From 2013 to 2017, she was head of the UN Women's New Delhi Office representing the four countries of India, Bhutan, Maldives and Sri Lanka.

In December 2015, representing UN Women, she signed a Memorandum of Understanding (MoU) in New Delhi with Jyotsna Suri, President of the Federation of Indian Chambers of Commerce and Industry (FICCI) to promote gender equality and Women’s empowerment in the corporate sector.

In 2017 in Afghanistan as head of UN Women, she visited most of the country and implemented the National Action Plan on Women, Peace, and Security, in collaboration with the Foreign Ministry. She also engaged with mullahs on the education of men for prevention of violence against women, helped draft legislation on Ending Violence Against Women in collaboration with the national Ministry of Women’s Affairs, and trained Ministry of Finance officials in gender budgeting.

== Publications ==
Tavares was editor of a book Race in Contemporary Brazil: From Indifference to Inequality (1999), " She coauthored with Sonia Correa, a book, Population and Reproductive Rights.
