= Rebecca Pomroy =

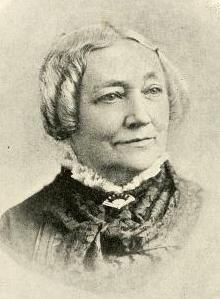
Rebecca Pomroy, from an 1897 publication.

Rebecca Rossignol Pomroy (born in Boston, Massachusetts, 16 July 1817; died in Newton, Massachusetts, 24 January 1884) was a nurse and philanthropist of the United States. During the Civil War, she worked in military hospitals, and also looked after the family of President Abraham Lincoln twice.

== Biography ==
Pomroy was the daughter of Samuel and Dorcas Holliday. Her father was a captain of a merchant ship, and died when she was 14 she was born July 1817 and her father died March 29, 1832, and she, her mother and her three sisters lived on the income from sewing. On 12 September 1836, she married Daniel F. Pomroy, an upholsterer. Sickness in her own family for nearly twenty years made her an accomplished nurse.

When her only surviving son enlisted in the Union Army, she offered her services to Dorothea Dix. She was at once called to Washington, D.C., and in September 1861 assigned to duty in Georgetown Hospital, but was soon transferred to the hospital at Columbian College, now part of Georgetown University. Early in 1862 she was called to the White House at the time of the death of Willie Lincoln, and nursed "Tad Lincoln," the youngest son, then very ill, and Mary Todd Lincoln, until both were restored to health. President Lincoln said to her at that time, "Tell your grandchildren how indebted the nation was to you in holding up my hands in time of trouble."

Pomroy then returned to the hospital and continued in her work. In 1864, when the president's life was threatened and Mary Lincoln was suffering from injuries that she had received in a fall from her carriage, Pomroy again went to the White House. Later in the year, she spent some time at the West Hospital in Baltimore, but ultimately returned to the hospital at Columbian University. Refusing advantageous offers to go elsewhere, she remained at her post until the close of the war.

Then she was stricken with typhoid fever, and was an invalid for several years. She became matron in 1867 of a reformatory home for girls at Newton Centre, Massachusetts, and then of the Newton Home for Orphans and Destitute Girls, which became the Rebecca Pomroy Home after her death.
