= Rebecca Chambers (disambiguation) =

Rebecca Chambers is a fictional character in the Resident Evil media franchise.

Rebecca or Becky Chambers may also refer to:

- Becky Chambers (born 1985), American author of science fiction novels
- Rebecca Chambers (pianist) (born 1975), Australian concert pianist and the 1996 winner the Young Australian of the Year Award
- Rebecca Ballard Chambers (1858–1920), newspaper editor-in-chief and temperance leader
- Rebecca Chambers (born 1970), Canadian pole vaulter who competed in the 1999 Pan American Games
