= Rebecca Price =

Rebecca Price may refer to:

- Rebecca Lane Pennypacker Price (1837–1919), American nurse
- Rebecca Price (boxer), Welsh contestant in 2012 AIBA Women's World Boxing Championships
- Rebecca Price (soccer), Australian player in 2012 W-League grand final
- Rebecca Price (runner), American winner of 1984 women's Antwerp Marathon

== See also ==
- Becky Price (born 1974), Canadian field hockey player
