= Rebecca Jones =

Rebecca Jones may refer to:

- Rebecca Jones (Mexican actress) (1957–2023), Mexican actress
- Rebecca Jones (archaeologist), Scottish archaeologist
- Rebecca Jones (astronomer) (died 1966), American astronomer and discoverer of the Jones-Emberson 1 nebula
- Rebecca Naomi Jones (born 1981), American actress and singer
- Rebecca Field Jones (1905–2002), American artist
- Rebecca Jones (Quaker) (1739–1818), Quaker minister and educator

== See also ==
- Rebekah Jones, American data scientist and former official of the Florida Department of Health
