= Rebecca Shaw =

Rebecca Shaw may refer to:

- Rebecca Shaw (author), writer, teacher of deaf children
- Rebecca Shaw (General Hospital), fictional character
- Rebecca Shaw, first officer of Colgan Air Flight 3407
- Becky Shaw, a 2008 play by Gina Gionfriddo
