= Rebecca Moore =

Rebecca Moore may refer to:

- Rebecca Moore (singer-songwriter) (born 1968), American musician, actress and animal rights activist
- Rebecca Moore (pageant titleholder) (born 1988), American beauty pageant contestant
- Rebecca Moore (scientist), American software engineer and director of Google Earth
- Rebecca Moore (architect), Western Australia Government Architect (2020–present)
