= Rebecca Bishop =

Rebecca Bishop may refer to:

- Rebecca Bishop, fictional character in A Discovery of Witches and Shadow of Night
- Rebecca Bishop, fictional character in Prototype (TV film)
