= Rebecca Sharp =

Rebecca Sharp may refer to:

== Fiction ==
- Becky Sharp, the anti-heroine in the 1847 novel Vanity Fair and numerous adaptations into other media
- Becky Sharp (film), 1935 film based on Vanity Fair

== People ==
- Rebecca Joy Sharp (born 1979), Scottish harpist, collaborator with poet Josephine Dickinson
- Rebecca Sharp, American paralegal charged in connection with drug charges against Andrew C. Thornton II

== Other ==
- Rebecca Sharp (horse), thoroughbred horse trained by Geoff Wragg
