= Rebecca Scheiner =

Rebecca Scheiner is a German stage director; she directs operas and musicals. She has worked at the Vienna State Opera and with the Vienna Boys' Choir.
