= Rebecca Costa =

Rebecca Costa may refer to:

- Rebecca D. Costa (born 1955), American futurist and sociobiologist
- Rebecca Da Costa (born 1984), Brazilian actress and model
