= Rebecca Calisi =

American neuroendocrinologist

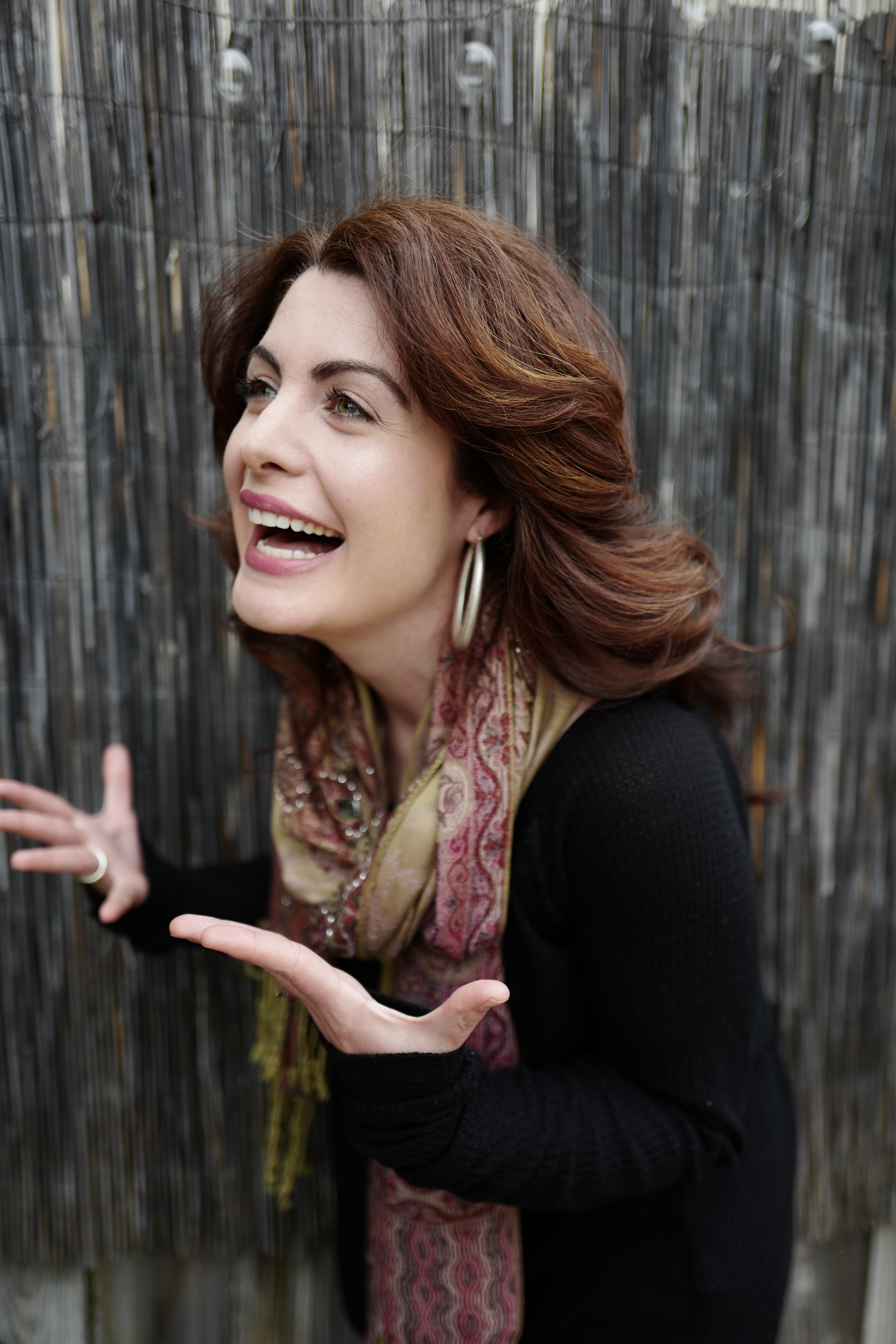
- Calisi in 2018
- Born: Rebecca Marie Calisi Rodríguez; September 13, 1979 (age 47); Dallas, Texas
- Education: B.A. Boston College, M.S. University of Texas, Arlington, Ph.D. University of California, Berkeley
- Known for: Studies of stress on reproductive neurobiology; advocacy for underrepresented groups in science; science communication online personality
- Awards: 2019 Early Career Impact Award - Federation of Associations in Behavioral and Brain Sciences, 2018-2019 National Geographic Explorer Award, 2018 Nature Research Inspiring Science Award, 2016 - Environmental Health Science Faculty Scholar Award, 2011 - Dorothy Skinner Outstanding Young Investigator Award
- Scientific career
- Fields: Animal Behavior, Human-Animal Interactions, Neuroendocrinology
- Workplaces: University of California, Davis

Rebecca Marie Calisi (born September 13, 1979) is an American neuroendocrinologist, wildlife biologist, and National Geographic Explorer. She is an Associate professor of Neurobiology, Physiology, and Behavior in the College of Biological Sciences at the University of California, Davis. She leads a research team that studies how the brain controls sexual behavior, reproduction, and parental care, and how this changes under stress. As the Director for Science Communications at UC Davis, she studies science communication and advocates for inclusivity, equity, and diversity in STEM.

== Early life and education ==
Calisi was born in Dallas, Texas, on September 13, 1979, to a Mexican-American mother, Dolores Rebecca (née Rodríguez), and an Italian-American father, Anthony Paul Calisi. When not in school, she spent a lot of her time on her maternal grandparents cattle ranch near the Texas-Mexico border. Constantly being surrounded by animals developed her passion for animal behavior from a young age, but also had a talent for fine arts. She attended Skidmore College in Saratoga Springs, New York, where she studied studio art and theater. Some of her theater classmates included Lake Bell and Jon Bernthal. Calisi later moved to Massachusetts where she attended Boston College, majoring in cultural psychology and minoring in studio art.

After completing her Bachelors of Arts in 2001, Calisi returned to Texas and was hired by the Dallas Independent School District as an Elementary School Teacher and an English as a Second Language Instructor for kindergarten through the 4th grade. Calisi stayed in this role for one year before being recruited by the Dallas Zoo and Aquarium in 2002 to teach and develop curricula for grades K-12. There, she was commissioned to paint a mural for the zoo's education center.

During this time, Calisi spent many hours volunteering on various animal conservation projects. The biologists she worked with noted that she had a talent for research and encouraged her to pursue a graduate degree in the science. She earned a Masters in Biology at the University of Texas, Arlington. Her research project involved studying the mating habits and coloration of a species of spiny lizard called Sceloporus pyrocephalus in which the females are brightly colored and aggressive. She uncovered what hormones were driving changes in female coloration and aggression. Calisi completed her Masters in 2006.

=== Mexican Boulder Spiny Lizards ===
During her Masters, Calisi published several first-author papers exploring the physiology of the female Mexican boulder spiny lizard (Sceloporus pyrocephalus). A striking observation is that the female lizards have much brighter and more intense coloration than the males. Calisi sought to understand the endocrine mechanisms regulating coloration and found that higher cortisol levels were associated with less outstanding coloration and higher testosterone and estradiol were associated with more conspicuous coloration. She reported these findings in her Masters thesis, "Proximate And Ultimate Mechanisms Associated With Female Secondary Coloration In The Mexican Boulder Spiny Lizard (Sceloporus pyrocephalus)", and proposed that color is an honesty signal of reproductive status in females and that these findings should modify our concept of sexual selection to be more inclusive to female coloration and behavior.

=== Interaction between stress and reproduction in avian models ===
Calisi decided to pursue graduate studies at the University of California, Berkeley within the Department of Integrative Biology. She was still driven to understand the biological underpinning of parental care behavior, and felt that the best possible organism to study this in was birds so she joined the lab of Dr. George Bently. Under Bently's mentorship, Calisi first explored how stress modulates the reproductive axis via interactions with the hypothalamic gonadotropin-inhibitory hormone (GnIH) system. Since GnIH is known to down-regulate sexual behavior in birds, this was an important aspect of the reproductive system to probe due to its regulatory function. They found that stress, specifically in the spring, leads to increased activity of the paraventricular nucleus (PVN) as well as increased expression of GnIH cells suggesting that the impact of stress on the PVN and the GnIH system is dependent on the phase of the reproductive cycle. For her thesis work, Calisi showed the effects of both stress and the social environment on GnIH and she found that stress hormone receptors are expressed on GnIH cells which highlights a direct mechanism by which stress can regulate reproductive behavior in birds.

After finishing her graduate studies in 2010, Calisi conducted postdoctoral studies under the mentorship of Dr. John Wingfield, at UC Davis and Dr. Timothy Q. Gentner at UC San Diego. She studied how hormonal fluctuations in adulthood affect learning. Calisi and her colleagues found that circulating estradiol (E2) levels in combination with changes in the photoperiod affect learning in different ways. Birds given high doses of E2 exhibited better accuracy in auditory tasks when photostimulated but worse accuracy when photosensitive. Funded by the National Science Foundation and well as the University of California President's Postdoctoral Fellowship, Calisi continued to explore how neuroendocrine and molecular factors influence reproductive and sexual behaviors in birds as a postdoctoral researcher under the mentorship of Dr. Erica Bree Rosenblum and Dr. Lance Kriegsfeld from 2013 until 2014.

== Career and research ==
Calisi was recruited to Barnard College at Columbia University for her first faculty position as an Assistant Professor of Biology in 2014. Her lab focused on exploring how physical, chemical, and social environments affect health and reproduction of organisms at a neurobiological level.

Calisi was quickly recruited back to the West Coast in 2015 by the University of California, Davis where she took on multiple faculty titles. Calisi became an Associate Professor of Neurobiology, Physiology, and Behavior at the College of Biological Sciences, as well as a faculty in the Center for the Advancement of Multicultural Perspectives on Science, and a faculty in the Environmental Health Sciences Center. Calisi's lab still focuses on understanding the biological mechanisms underlying reproductive and parental care behavior through the lens of neurogenomics. Her lab explores the genetic changes that occur in the brain that underlie parental behaviors and they further look at how insults to the stress system affect genomic activity in brain regions implicated in reproduction.

=== Pigeons as an indicator of environmental toxins ===
Shortly after setting up her lab, Calisi published innovative findings from work she conducted while at Barnard. Since her lab focuses on birds as a model organism, specifically pigeons, Calisi and her colleagues found that feral pigeons could provide an honest indicator of lead in NYC, that blood lead levels were highest in the summer and that pigeon blood lead levels were mirrored in children in those neighbourhoods. As pigeons could provide a potent indicator of other environmental pollutants, Calisi has been supported by UC Davis to extend her research to look for evidence of other environmental toxins in pigeons that mirror neighbourhood level toxin load.

=== Neurogenomics and reproduction ===
Calisi's group also focuses on exploring sexually dimorphic gene expression throughout the tissues of the Hypothalamic-Pituitary-Gonadal (HPG) axis. Their analysis showed that sex-differences are evident along this axis, such as differences in androgen receptor, prolactin, and arginine vasopressin receptor 1A that highlight the critical need to for sex parity in further research on reproductive function and health. This work provided a critical baseline for Calisi's next question regarding the effectcs of stress on the HPG axis. Calisi and her group looked at the transcriptomic differences across male and female rock doves in response to restraint stress. They found that female rock doves exhibited increased responses to stress at all levels of the HPG axis compared to males and these many of the changes were in genes that are uniquely responsive in females.

=== Effects of pollutants on endocrine function ===
Calisi's focus on understanding how exposure to environmental pollutants affects endocrine function has taken her into a new realm of model organism, the western mosquito fish. In study in 2019, Calisi explored how pesticides impact gene expression and reproductive behavior in fish. They found that, despite no observable behavioral changes, they detected increased estrogen receptor and glucocorticoid receptor in brain tissue suggesting that nonlethal concentrations of pollutants have long lasting effects on the nervous system.

== Advocacy ==
Calisi is a fervent advocate for equity in STEM and works to affect tangible change in her scientific community specifically to improve the lives of mothers in STEM. After having her first child, Calisi became aware of the lack of support for mothers in science in terms of lack of spaces for lactation at work and conference settings, lack of child-care at conferences, and a lack of an open culture that supports mothers in STEM from early on in the pipeline.

She has written articles and given seminars and lectures on the topic of supporting women, mothers, and underrepresented minorities in STEM. After one particular conference, Calisi noticed the lack of suitable lactation rooms and she organized a working group of 45 mothers in science to speak up about the issue and request basic needs to support mothers working in academia when they are required to attend conferences. She, along with the working group, wrote an article that was published in the Proceedings of the National Academy of Sciences discussing the issues mothers face at conferences and how to solve them in a simple, cheap manner. Her writing has been featured in the Scientific American as well where she discusses the "publish or perish" culture of academia not being compatible with supporting a family, and that the majority of this burden is placed on mothers making it even harder for women to stay competitive in academia beside their male peers.

In Calisi's work with the Center for the Advancement of Multicultural Perspectives on Science (CAMPOS), she has been further focusing on making sure that a culture of inclusivity extends to typically underrepresented background in STEM. Using her creativity from a background in art, she just finished a video series highlighting Latina women scientists, of which she is one, to show young Latina students that they can be successful scientists, too.

Alongside these efforts, Calisi is focusing a component of her lab on Science Communication in order to insure that everyone has access to reputable and understandable information about scientific discoveries. Calisi was honored with the role of Science Communications Creative Strategist for the NIH Director's Office Data Commons Project.

== The Green Care Lab ==
In response to the widespread mental health effects of the COVID-19 pandemic, Calisi Rodríguez expanded her research on the neurobiology and physiology of stress to investigate how interactions with animals and natural environments might promote recovery and well-being. In 2022, she founded the Green Care Lab at the University of California, Davis, integrating her expertise in animal behavior, stress physiology, and behavioral neuroendocrinology with the emerging field of green care.

The lab conducts non-invasive research examining the effects of structured interactions with animals and nature on human health and well-being, using physiological and behavioral measures of stress, mood, and social connection. Its work combines community-engaged research with undergraduate education and partnerships between UC Davis and local agricultural and animal-care communities, with the broader goal of establishing an evidence base for nature- and animal-based approaches to supporting human well-being.Research from the Green Care Lab has received national media attention, including coverage of its studies on how brief interactions with animals can affect mood and well-being.

== Skyheart Sanctuary ==
Calisi Rodríguez is the founder of Skyheart Sanctuary, a 501(c)(3) nonprofit organization in Davis, California, that combines farm-animal rescue with nature-based education and community engagement. The sanctuary provides care for rescued and rehomed animals while offering hands-on educational programs in animal behavior, animal care, science, and environmental stewardship for children and teenagers. Through partnerships with community organizations and the UC Davis Green Care Lab, Skyheart also serves as a setting for experiential learning, undergraduate training, and non-invasive research on human-animal interactions. Calisi Rodríguez founded the organization as an extension of her efforts to make science, animals, and nature more accessible to the surrounding community, particularly to young people who benefit from alternative, hands-on learning environments.

== Awards and honors ==
- 2019-2024 National Science Foundation Grant - "Single Parenting in a Bi-Parental System: Discovering Changes in Brain, Behavior, and Reproductive Success" - IOS CAREER award
- 2019 Early Career Impact Award - Federation of Associations in Behavioral and Brain Sciences (FABBS) in recognition of major research contributions to the sciences of mind, brain, and behavior
- 2018-2019 National Geographic Explorer Award - National Geographic Research and Exploration Award
- 2018 Nature Research Inspiring Science Award (longlisted with 9 other finalists) - Nature Research partners with Estée Lauder to honor exceptional female scientists
- 2016 Environmental Health Science Faculty Scholar Award Center for Environmental Health Science - University of California, Davis
- 2011 Dorothy Skinner Outstanding Young Investigator Award - Society for Integrative & Comparative Biology
- 2010-2013 Post-Doctoral Research Fellowship - National Science Foundation
- 2010 Warder Clyde Allee Award, Best Talk Presentation - Society for Animal Behavior
- 2009-2010 Ford Dissertation Fellowship - National Research Council
- 2008 Mentor Research Award - University of California, Berkeley
- 2008 Outstanding Teaching Award - University of California, Berkeley
- 2008 - Grant-in-Aid of Research from the Society for Integrative and Comparative Biology to study starlings in Kenya
- 2008 Best Presentation of Scientific Research - Division of Neurobiology, Society of Integrative and Comparative Biology

== Select publications ==
- Short, C.J.M. and Calisi, R.M. 2026. Mutual wellbeing in an equine-assisted intervention: experimental evidence for the two-way hypothesis and the importance of interaction method. Scientific Reports. 16, 27658 (2026). https://doi.org/10.1038/s41598-026-65168-2
- Ligocki, I.Y., Munson, A., Farrar, V., Viernes, R., Sih, A., Connon, R.E., Calisi, R.M. 2019. Ecologically relevant concentrations of bifenthrin affect the expression of estrogen and glucocorticoid receptors in brains of female western mosquitofish. Aquatic Toxicology. 209:121-131.
- Calisi, R.M., Austin, S., Lang, A., MacManes, M. 2018. Sex-biased transcriptomic response of the reproductive axis to stress. Hormones and Behavior. 100, 56–68. COVER.
- Ondrasek, N.R., Freeman, S.M., Saldana, E., Orellana Bonilla, I., Bales, K.L. and Calisi, R.M. 2018. Nonapeptide receptor distributions in promising avian models for social neuroecology. Frontiers in Ecology and Evolution. doi: 10.3389/fnins.2018.00713
- MacManes, M., Austin, S., Lang, A., Booth, A. Farrar, V. and Calisi, R.M. 2017. Transcriptomics reveals patterns of sexually dimorphic gene expression in an avian hypothalamic-pituitary-gonadal (HPG) axis. Scientific Reports. 7:45125
- Calisi, R.M., Chintamen, S.*, Ennin, E.*, Kriegsfeld, L.J., Rosenblum, E.B. 2017. Neuroanatomical evolution in response to a changing environment. Journal of Herpetology. 51:258-262.
- Cai, F.* and Calisi, R.M. 2016. Seasons and neighborhoods of high lead toxicity in New York City: the feral pigeon as a bioindicator. Chemosphere, 161: 274–279.
- Calisi, R.M. and MacManes, M. 2015. RNAseq-ing a more integrative understanding of animal behavior. Current Opinions in Behavioral Sciences, 6: 65–68.
- Calisi, R.M. and Saldanha, C. 2015. Neurohormones, brain and behavior: A comparative approach to understanding rapid neuroendocrine action. Integrative and Comparative Biology.
- Calisi, R.M., Rizzo, N.O.*, Bentley, G.E. 2008. Seasonal differences in hypothalamic EGR-1 and GnIH expression following capture-handling stress in house sparrows (Passer domesticus). General and Comparative Endocrinology, 157(3): 283–287.
- Calisi, R.M. 2006. Proximate and ultimate mechanisms associated with female coloration in the Mexican boulder spiny lizard, Sceloporus pyrocephalus. Master's Thesis, University of Texas, Arlington, University of Texas Publishing Press, 4396 2.
