= Rebecca Reynolds =

Rebecca Reynolds may refer to:

- Rebecca Reynolds (academic), British physician and academic
- Rebecca Reynolds (poet), American poet
- Rebecca Reynolds (politician) (born 1949), American politician in the state of Iowa
