= Rebecca Patek =

Rebecca Patek is an American choreographer and performance artist.
