= Rebecca James =

Rebecca James may refer to:

- Becky James (born 1991), Welsh cyclist
- Rebecca James (author) (born 1970), Australian author
- Rebecca Salsbury James (1891–1968) American artist
- Rebecca James, a character on the TV series Veronica Mars

== See also ==
- Rebecca St. James, Australian American contemporary Christian singer, songwriter and actress
