= Rebecca Stirm =

Rebecca Marie Stirm
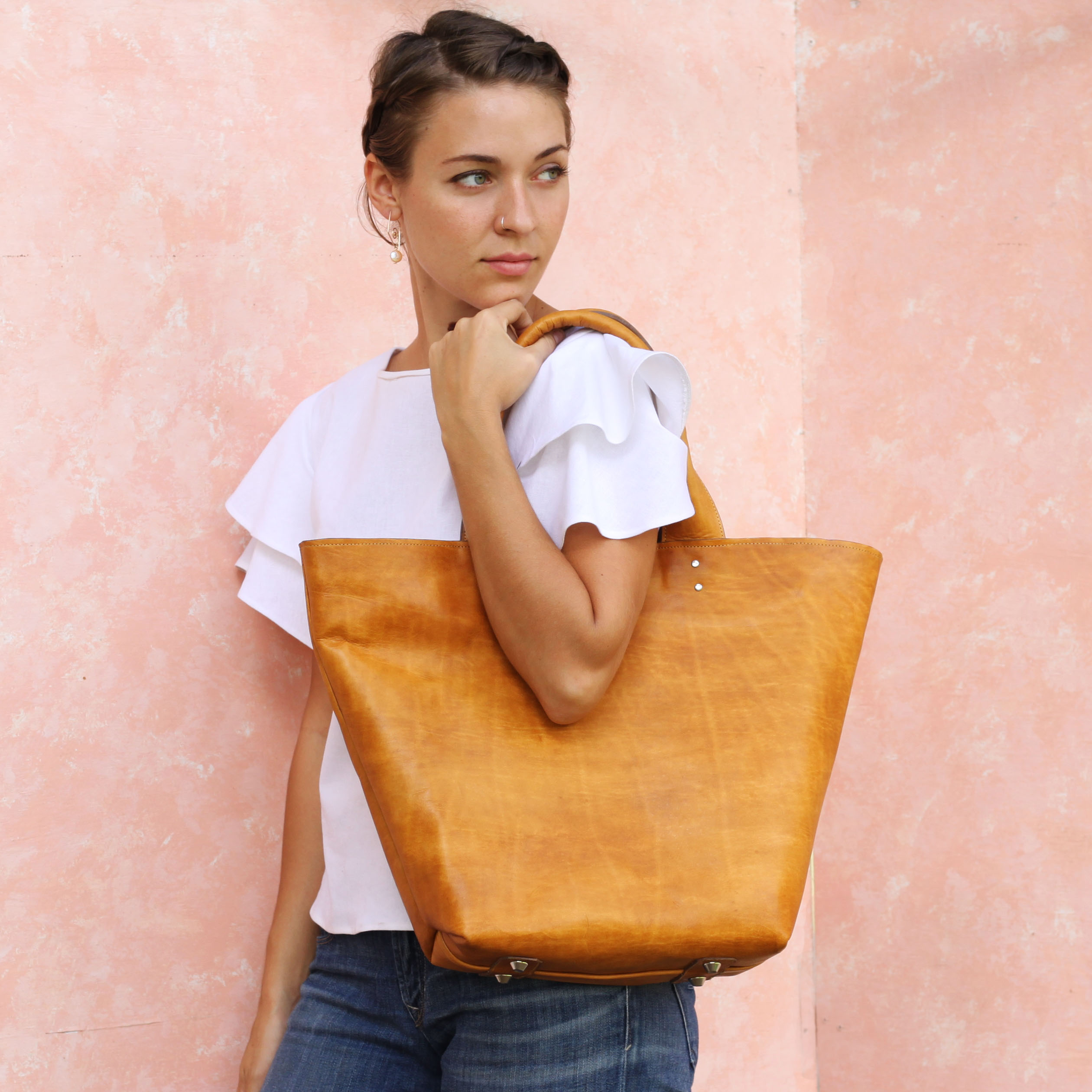
- Born: February 9, 1993 (age 33); Belize
- Website: www.twigandpearl.com

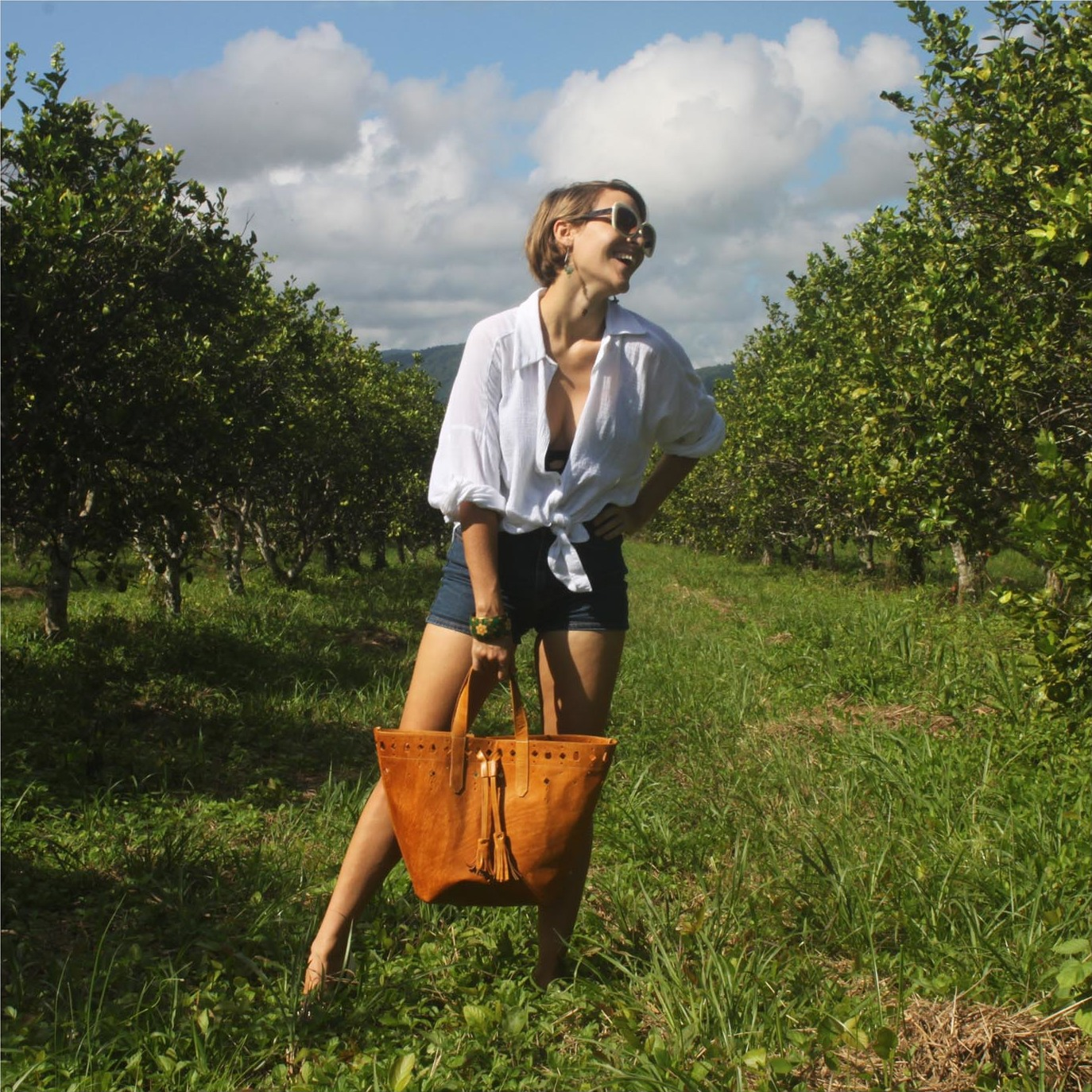
Rebecca Stirm for Twig & pearl Handbags

Rebecca Marie Stirm (born February 9, 1993) is a fashion designer from Belize. In 2012, she represented Belize in Mission Catwalk which features designers from around the Caribbean. She designs women's wear and handbags under the brand Twig & Pearl (formerly known as Rebecca Stirm Clothing).

== Early life and education ==
Rebecca Stirm began drawing, painting, playing music, and sewing at an early age. Over time, Stirm began to lean more towards design, and her sketches slowly drifted away from portraits and landscapes to focusing more on figure drawing and garment sketches. She began designing clothing for herself, until her senior year of high school when Stirm was encouraged by a close friend to actually hold her first fashion show. After graduating high school, Stirm created her first collection of day dresses and cocktail dresses, held her first runway show, and received her first orders for dresses from her collection.

== Achievements and works ==
After her first successful collection, Rebecca realized her love for designing clothes could actually become a viable business. She continued designing pieces and showcased a second collection before re-locating to Vancouver in June 2011 for a semester in fashion design, construction, and marketing at the Art Institute of Vancouver.

Shortly after returning to Belize, she was accepted to represent Belize on the Caribbean designer reality TV show competition Mission Catwalk. There, 19 other Caribbean designers compete for a chance to “Rule the Catwalk.” She won the most challenges (4 out of 12) and came out as second runner up. Upon returning to Belize, Rebecca launched her business, designing and constructing custom occasion-wear.

Rebecca continued showcasing her work locally and later return to Jamaica in 2013 to showcase her "Pfuma Ye Nyika" collection on the runway at the Wyndham Wedding Spectacular.

In 2014, Rebecca flew to London to represent Belize at the Splendours of the Common Wealth charity event to raise money for the CCLEF charity foundation.

After three years of designing custom gowns and collections, receiving a grant to invest in heavy duty machinery, and investing countless hours and marketing in her brand, Rebecca discovered that she no-longer believed in the business that she was building. Her belief in the need for sustainable business development, a lessened environmental impact of fashion production, and her current design process and production methods, just weren't lining up. “I realized that by designing custom occasion wear that women would wear once, and then either away in an already-full closet, never to be seen again, I was contributing to the problem : landfills full of polyester clothing that have only been worn once, and are being basically thrown away afterwards.” She realized that this was not the business she wanted to be in, closed down Rebecca Stirm Clothing, and took a season off to re-think and reassess her direction.

== TWIG & PEARL ==
In the fall of 2015, she launched her first line of minimally designed leather handbags. The bags begun to sell successfully, and a year and a half later she would launch her e-commerce site—twigandpearl.com. Since then, she has released new collections of handbags, and launched a small line of natural-fiber clothing under her own name. She has incorporated beading, recycled bamboo, exotic hardwoods, and hand-printed fabrics into her collections, and in the fall of 2017, she launched a mini-collection of handbags in collaboration with OCEANA Belize, designed to bring awareness to the endangered Hawksbill Turtle.
