= Rebecca Willett =

American statistician and computer scientist

Rebecca Willett is an American statistician and computer scientist whose research involves machine learning, signal processing, and data science. She is a professor of statistics and computer science at the University of Chicago.

Willett has a Ph.D. in electrical and computer engineering from Rice University, completed in 2005. She worked as a faculty member in electrical and computer engineering at Duke University from 2005 until 2013, when she moved to the University of Wisconsin–Madison. She moved again to the University of Chicago in 2018.

Her research has included machine learning methods for the analysis of corn crop quality, and weather patterns. She was named a SIAM Fellow in the 2021 class of fellows, "for contributions to mathematical foundations of machine learning, large-scale data science, and computational imaging", and an IEEE Fellow in 2022 "for contributions to the foundations of computational imaging and large-scale data science". In 2022, she was elected Vice Chair of the Society for Industrial and Applied Mathematics Activity Group on Imaging Science (SIAM SIAG/IS).
