= Rebecca Lee Dorsey =

American physician (1859–1954)

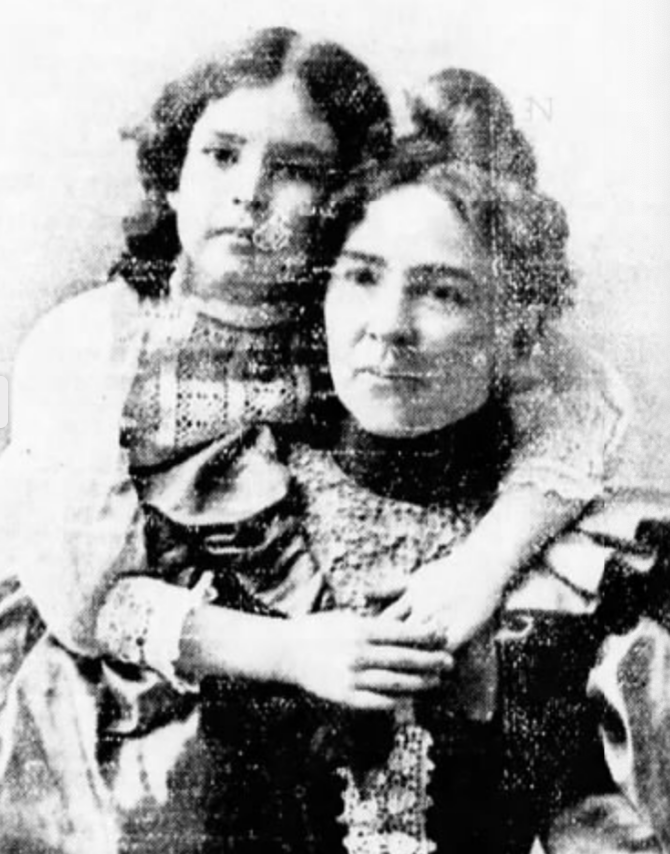
- Rebecca Lee Dorsey (and her niece, also named Rebecca Lee Dorsey), from a 1901 newspaper
- Born: August 30, 1859; Port Deposit, Maryland
- Died: March 29, 1954 (aged 94); Los Angeles, California
- Occupations: Physician, obstetrician, endocrinologist
- Relatives: Robert Kellard (grand-nephew)

Rebecca Lee Dorsey (August 30, 1859 – March 29, 1954) was an American physician and endocrinologist. She is known as the world's first female endocrinologist and the first woman physician to practice in Los Angeles.

== Early life and education ==
Dorsey was born in Port Deposit, Maryland, the daughter of William Hammond Dorsey and Ellen Martha Gillespie Dorsey. She was a sickly child, who cared for her mother and siblings as they died from tuberculosis. She attended Wellesley College and later became the first Wellesley graduate to earn a medical degree. Dorsey attended Boston University School of Medicine, graduating in June 1883. She then traveled to Europe to study under Louis Pasteur, Robert Koch, and Joseph Lister. Shortly before her death in 1954, a Los Angeles Times profile called her "possibly the only living link in the medical world with the men who laid the foundations of modern medicine."

== Career ==
Dorsey moved to Los Angeles in 1886, and established her own medical practice, specializing in obstetrics, pediatrics, and later, endocrinology. She was said to have been the attending physician at over 4,000 births during her lifetime (including the birth of Chief Justice Earl Warren), to have founded a nursing school and organized the city's first maternity ward, and to have administered the first diphtheria inoculation in Los Angeles in about 1893. Dorsey retired from a full-time medical practice around 1913, and established a date farm near Indio, California, with a variety of date palms imported from Egypt.

Dorsey was involved in a number of legal disputes. In the 1890s, she was arrested for failing to report a case of typhoid, as required by law; she was also sued by a widow who claimed that Dorsey failed to uphold a contract to make life insurance payments for a business partner. In the 1910s, her finances came under the scrutiny again; she owed money to several creditors, but claimed that as a farmer she could not be legally forced into involuntary bankruptcy. Her creditors said she was not a full-time farmer, and was therefor not protected from bankruptcy. The controversy lasted for several years. She was still facing bankruptcy proceedings in 1922.

== Personal life ==
Dorsey never married. She adopted and raised her niece, who was named Rebecca Lee Dorsey Jr. Dorsey Jr. married an actor, Ralph Kellard. They had two sons, Thomas Kellard and Robert Dorsey Kellard, who was also an actor. The physician Rebecca Dorsey died at her home in Los Angeles in 1954, at the age of 94, from lingering complications of a broken hip. Her grave is in Forest Lawn Memorial Park in Glendale, California.
