= Rebecca Morse =

Rebecca Morse may refer to:

- Rebecca Morse (journalist) (born 1977), Australian journalist and news presenter
- Rebecca A. Morse (1821–?), American club leader
- Rebecca Morse (ice hockey) (born 1992), American ice hockey defender
