= Rebecca Evans =

Rebecca Evans may refer to:

- Rebecca Evans (soprano) (born 1963), Welsh operatic soprano
- Rebecca Evans (politician) (born 1976), Welsh politician
- Becky Evans (born 1961), American politician from Georgia
