= Rebecca Coleman Curtis =

American author, psychologist, and psychoanalyst

Rebecca Coleman Curtis is an American author, psychologist, and psychoanalyst. Curtis has written extensively on the topics of Theories of Therapeutic Action, Creativity, Unconscious Processes, the Self, Self-Defeating Behaviors, Gender and Race.

== Career and research ==
Also a writer of poetry and fiction, Curtis teaches at the Derner Institute, Adelphi University, and the W. A. White Institute, New York, NY. She maintains a practice in psychotherapy and psychoanalysis in Miami, Florida, New York City, and Sag Harbor, New York. A native of New Orleans, La., she attended Benjamin Franklin Senior High School and Tulane University. Rebecca Coleman Curtis obtained a Ph.D. in social psychology in 1973 from Columbia University, and subsequently a degree in clinical psychology from Adelphi University. She also received a certificate in psychoanalysis from the W. A. White Institute in New York City. Dr. Curtis is involved in psychology and the arts as well as the integration of psychological science and psychoanalysis.

Curtis' interests are in the self-defeating behaviours of humans and how humans change over time. Her current projects analyse eating disorders, anxiety and depression, alcoholism and trauma in terms of psychotherapy and what can help in psychotherapy. She has published books on these topics, plus books on the self, psychoanalysis, psychotherapies and how humans cope with death and endings.
