= Rebecca Miller (disambiguation) =

Rebecca Miller (born 1962) is an American film director, screenwriter, author and actress.

Rebecca Miller may also refer to:

- Rebecca Miller (singer), Canadian country music artist
- Rebecca Miller (conductor), American conductor of classical music
- Rebecca Miller (footballer), Australian rules footballer
- Rebecca Miller (EastEnders), fictional character
