= Rebecca Lee =

Rebecca Lee may refer to:

- Rebecca Lee (explorer) (born 1944), explorer from Hong Kong
- Rebecca Lee (writer) (born 1967), American novelist and professor
- Rebecca Lee Crumpler (1831–1895), African-American physician
- Rebecca "Revy" Lee, Black Lagoon character
- Beki Smith (Rebecca Smith née Lee, born 1986), Australian race walker

== See also ==
- Becky Lee (born 1978), Hong Kong TVB actress and host
