= Rebecca Buckley =

American female medical researcher in immunology

Rebecca Hatcher Buckley (born 1933) is a medical doctor who has conducted research in pediatric immunological diseases.

== Biography ==
Buckley graduated from Duke University in 1954 with a bachelor's degree. She received her Doctor of Medicine in 1958 from North Carolina School of Medicine, and training in pediatrics at Duke.

Buckley joined the faculty of Duke University Medical Center in 1961. She was the chairwoman of the Immune Deficiency Foundation (IDF) and Chair of the IDF Medical Advisory Committee and the J. Buren Sidbury Professor of Pediatrics and professor of immunology at Duke University Medical Center. On September 12, 2011 she was elected to be a member of the National Academy of Science. and was inducted on April 29, 2012.

== Awards and honors ==
- 2014, Lifetime Achievement Award in Genetics from the American College of Medical Genetics.
- 2014, John Howland Award, American Pediatric Society
- 1991, 29th annual National Board Award, receiving the Medical College of Pennsylvania's Presidential Medal and a $5,000 research grant
