= Kalven (surname) =

Kalven is a surname. Notable people with the surname include:

- Harry Kalven (1914–1974), American jurist
- Janet Kalven (1913–2014), American Catholic educator and writer

== See also ==
- Kallen
- Kalven
