= Ohio Women's Hall of Fame =

American hall of fame for women established in 1978

The Ohio Women's Hall of Fame was a program the State of Ohio's Department of Job and Family Services ran from 1978 through 2011. The Hall has over 400 members. In 2019, the Hall's physical archives and online records were transferred to the State Archives in the Ohio History Center.

== History ==
The Hall was created in 1978 within the Women's Programs at the Ohio Department of Job and Family Services. The Hall "provided public recognition of the contributions Ohio women have made to the growth and progress of Ohio, the United States, and the world."

The Hall inducted women in the following categories:

Category	
Arts, Music and Journalism	64
Business and Labor	46
Education	39
Government and Military Service	49
Law	14
Math, Science and Health Services	62
Religion and Community Services	75
Sports and Athletics	16
Women's Suffrage and Cultural Activism	37

After the program ended, its physical archives were transferred to the Ohioana Library, where they were held until they were transferred in 2019 to the State Archives in the Ohio History Center.

== Inductees ==
Ohio Women's Hall of Fame
Name	Image	Birth–death	County	Year	Area of achievement
Florence Allen		(1884–1966)	Cuyahoga	1978	American judge. Allen was the first woman to serve on a state Supreme Court and one of the first two women to serve as a federal judge.
Helen Chatfield Black		(1924–2018)	Hamilton	1978	Co-founded the Cincinnati Nature Center and Little Miami, Inc. Black was president of the Ohio chapter of The Nature Conservancy and board member of the Ohio Environmental Council.
Frances Bolton		(1885–1977)	Cuyahoga	1978	Politician from Ohio who served in the United States House of Representatives. Bolton was the first woman elected to Congress from Ohio.
Elizabeth Boyer		(1913–2002)	Geauga	1978	American lawyer, feminist and writer. In 1968, Boyer founded the Women's Equity Action League (WEAL) as a moderate feminist movement for professional women.
Harriet Bracken		(1919–2010)	Franklin	1978	First woman vice president of the Huntington National Bank of Columbus
Martha Kinney Cooper		(1874–1964)	Hamilton	1978	First Lady of Ohio from 1929 to 1931 as the wife of Governor Myers Y. Cooper
Gertrude Donahey		(1908–2004)	Franklin	1978	American politician of the Democratic party who served as Ohio State Treasurer from 1971 to 1983
Jane Edna Hunter		(1882–1971)	Cuyahoga	1978	African-American social worker who established the Working Girls Association in Cleveland, Ohio in 1911, which later became the Phillis Wheatley Association of Cleveland.
Consolata Kline		(1916–2016)	Mahoning	1978	Executive director of St. Elizabeth Hospital Medical Center
Virginia Kunkle		(1915–2005)	Franklin	1978	First woman to become assistant superintendent of public instruction in Ohio
Margaret A. Mahoney		(1893–1981)	Cuyahoga	1978	Member of the Ohio House of Representatives and the Ohio Senate. Mahoney was both Senate President Pro Tem and Majority Leader as well as Chief of the Ohio Division of Securities.
Helen Grace McClelland		(1887–1984)	Columbiana	1978	Awarded the Distinguished Service Cross for her service as a member of the Army Nurse Corps during World War I
Agnes Merritt		(1899–1992)	Franklin	1978	Former state president of the American Legion Auxiliary and advocate for women
Rose Papier		(1912–2000)	Franklin	1978	Pioneer gerontologist and Ohio's first Director of the Ohio Administration on Aging
Lottie Randolph		(1887–1968)	Perry	1978	Farmer and homemaker. Randolph was assistant director of Farm Labor at OSU.
Ella P. Stewart		(1893–1987)	Lucas	1978	One of the first African-American female pharmacists in the United States.
Marigene Valiquette		(1924–2024)	Lucas	1978	Former member of the Ohio General Assembly
Ann B. Walker		(1923–2025)	Franklin	1978	First woman broadcaster to report on the Ohio legislature
Stella Walsh		(1911–1980)	Cuyahoga	1978	Polish athlete who became a women's Olympic champion
Marion S. Wells		(1902–1983)	Licking	1978	Promoter of better treatment and education for disabled citizens
Mary Jobe Akeley		(1886–1966)	Harrison	1979	Explorer and naturalist. Akeley was one of the earliest women explorers in Africa where she and her husband Carl E. Akeley hunted and photographed animals during their natural history studies.
Mary Ann Bickerdyke		(1817–1901)	Knox	1979	Hospital administrator for Union soldiers during the American Civil War
Beatrice Cleveland		(1920–2012)	Franklin	1979	Associate State Leader for 4-H in the Extension Service, College of Agriculture, The Ohio State University
Charity Edna Earley		(1918–2002)	Montgomery	1979	First black commissioned officer in the Women's Army Corps
Eleanor Jammal		(1925–2019)	Ashtabula	1979	Businesswoman, member of Zonta International and numerous boards
Bernice Kochan		(1926–)	Cuyahoga	1979	Artist and designer of postage stamps
Emily Leedy		(1921–2011)	Franklin	1979	Chair of the Women's Advisory Council of the Ohio Bureau of Employment Services
Ruth Lyons		(1905–1988)	Hamilton	1979	Pioneer radio and television broadcaster in Cincinnati
Jerrie Mock		(1925–2014)	Franklin	1979	First woman to fly solo around the world.
Emma Phaler		(1882–1982)	Franklin	1979	Bowler and contributor to the Women's International Bowling Congress
Rachel Redinger		(1920–2001)	Tuscarawas	1979	Founder of the Ohio Outdoor Historical Drama Association and vice chair of the Ohio Arts Council
Bobbie L. Sterne		(1919–2017)	Hamilton	1979	Member of the Charter Party and Cincinnati's first female mayor
Ethel Swanbeck		(1893–1989)	Huron	1979	Former member of the Ohio House of Representatives, served eleven consecutive terms in the Ohio House from 1955 to 1976.
Clara Weisenborn		(1907–1985)	Montgomery	1979	Republican Ohio politician who served in the Ohio General Assembly
Marjorie M. Whiteman		(1898—1986)	Henry	1979	Legal advisor to Eleanor Roosevelt and author of the fifteen volume Digest of International Law
Grace Berlin		(1897–1982)	Lucas	1980	One of the first Ohio women to earn a degree in ecology; officer of the National Audubon Society
Erma Bombeck		(1927–1996)	Montgomery	1980	American humorist who achieved great popularity for her newspaper column that described suburban home life from the mid-1960s until the late 1990s
Patricia M. Byrne		(1925–2007)	Cuyahoga	1980	Ambassador to the Socialist Republic of the Union of Burma
Ruth Crawford		(1901–1953)	Columbiana	1980	Modernist composer and American folk music specialist
Louisa Fast		(1878–1979)	Seneca	1980	National and international women's rights activist
Dorothy Fuldheim		(1893–1989)	Cuyahoga	1980	Journalist and anchor who spent the majority of her career at The Cleveland Press and WEWS-TV
Lillian Gish		(1893–1993)	Hamilton	1980	Stage, screen and television actress; called "The First Lady of American Cinema"
Esther Greisheimer		(1891–1982)	Ross	1980	Medical educator specializing in the fields of anesthesiology and cardiac research
Edith Keller		(1880–1978)	Morrow	1980	Supervisor of music for the Ohio Department of Education
Tella Kitchen		(1902–1988)	Ross	1980	Folk art painter
Blanche Krupansky		(1925–2008)	Cuyahoga	1980	Cleveland judge who became the second woman to sit on the Ohio Supreme Court when she was appointed in 1981.
Hattie Larlham		(1914–1996)	Auglaize	1980	Founder of Hattie Larlham, a non-profit organization that provides services to more than 1,500 children and adults with developmental disabilities
Mary Louise Nemeth		(1932–2012)	Cuyahoga	1980	Business publisher and industrial advertiser
Annie Oakley		(1860–1926)	Darke	1980	American sharpshooter and exhibition shooter. Oakley's talent and timely rise to fame led to a starring role in Buffalo Bill's Wild West show, which propelled her to become the first American female superstar.
Doris Martha Weber		(1898–1984)	Cuyahoga	1980	Artist and industrial photographer
Mildred Bayer		(1908–1990)	Franklin	1981	Founder and president of Health Clinics International
Tina Bischoff Lovin		(1958–)	Franklin	1981	World champion long-distance swimmer
Dorothy Cornelius		(1918–1992)	Franklin	1981	Executive director of the Ohio Nurses Association, president of the International Counsel of Nurses, president of the American Nurses Association, and president of the American Journal of Nursing Company
Doris Day		(1924–2019)	Hamilton	1981	American actress, singer, and animal rights activist
Phyllis Diller		(1917–2012)	Allen	1981	American actress and comedian
Eusebia Hunkins		(1902–1980)	Athens	1981	Musician and composer
Andre Norton		(1912–2005)	Cuyahoga	1981	American science fiction and fantasy author
Jean Starr Untermeyer		(1886–1970)	Muskingum	1981	Poet and translator
Harriet Taylor Upton		(1853–1945)	Portage	1981	Suffragette, author, and the first woman to be vice chairman of the Republican National Committee
Nancy Wilson		(1937–2018)	Ross	1981	American singer with more than 70 albums, and three Grammy Awards
A. Margaret Boyd		(1898–1978)	Jefferson	1982	Education
Ann Eriksson		(1927–1982)	Franklin	1982	Director of Ohio's Constitutional Revision Commission
Bernice Foley		(1902–1987)	Hamilton	1982	Writer, lecturer and fashion commentator
Zelma Watson George		(1903–1994)	Cuyahoga	1982	African American philanthropist, alternate in the United Nations General Assembly and headliner in Gian-Carlo Menotti's opera The Medium
Grace Goulder Izant		(1893–1984)	Cuyahoga	1982	Writer, historian and preservationist
Toni Morrison		(1931–2019)	Lorain	1982	American novelist, editor, and professor. Winner of the Nobel Prize in 1993 and in 1987 the Pulitzer Prize
Phyllis Sewell		(1930–2016)	Hamilton	1982	Executive at Federated Department Stores
Jayne Spain		(1927–2003)	Hamilton	1982	Corporate executive
Helen Zelkowitz		(1911–2006)	Knox	1982	Radio broadcaster and founder of WMVO
Harriet J. Anderson		(1913–1980)	Athens	1983	Painter and textile artist
Ione Biggs		(1916–2005)	Cuyahoga	1983	Political and social activist who has worked to address crime prevention, women's rights, voter registration, hunger, poverty and unemployment
Eula Bingham		(1929–2020)	Hamilton	1983	Assistant Secretary of Labor for Occupational Safety and Health during the Carter Administration.
Mary O. Boyle		(1941–)	Cuyahoga	1983	Member of the Ohio House of Representatives from the 15th district
Mariwyn Heath		(1935–2010)	Montgomery	1983	Chair of the Political Action Committee for Business and Professional Women and advocate for the Equal Rights Amendment
Josephine Irwin		(1890–1984)	Cuyahoga	1983	Suffragist and advocate for women's rights
Barbara Janis			Cuyahoga	1983	Union organizer and advocate for women
Lillian Janis		(1912–1981)	Cuyahoga	1983	Cleveland political figure
Minnie Player		(–1983)	Cuyahoga	1983	Leader of Cleveland's Welfare Rights Organization
Gloria Steinem		(1934–)	Lucas	1983	American feminist, journalist, and social and political activist who became nationally recognized as a leader of, and media spokeswoman for the women's liberation movement in the late 1960s and 1970s
Freda Winning		(1901–1978)	Sandusky	1983	Educator, Marine officer, government official and international diplomat
Mary E. Miller Young			Franklin	1983	Co-founder of the Ohio Commission on the Status of Women in 1970 and leader in the struggle for the Equal Rights Amendment
Sally Cooper		(1952–)	Franklin	1984	Activist opposing violence against women and children
Sarah E. Harris			Montgomery	1984	Former President of the Dayton Urban League and community board member
Cindy Noble Hauserman		(1958–)	Ross	1984	U.S. Olympic Basketball Team gold medalist
Marcy Kaptur		(1946–)	Lucas	1984	U.S. Representative for Ohio's 9th congressional district
Karen Nussbaum		(1950–)	Cuyahoga	1984	Executive director of Working America, a community affiliate of the AFL–CIO; former director of the United States Department of Labor Women's Bureau
Mary Rose Oakar		(1940–)	Cuyahoga	1984	Democratic politician and first Democratic woman elected to the United States Congress from Ohio
Catherine Pinkerton		(1921–2017)	Cuyahoga	1984	Lobbyist with NETWORK: A National Catholic Social Justice Lobby
Willa Beatrice Player		(1909–2003)	Summit	1984	First Black woman president of a four-year women's college
Judith Resnik		(1949–1986)	Summit	1984	Engineer and NASA astronaut who died in the destruction of Space Shuttle Challenger during the launch of mission STS-51-L
Helen Hooven Santmyer		(1895–1986)	Greene	1984	Writer
Marian Spencer		(1920–2019)	Hamilton	1984	Former Vice Mayor of the Cincinnati City Council and the first African American woman to be elected to the Council
Marian Trimble		(1933–2021)	Franklin	1984	President of Nationwide Investment Services
Joyce Wollenberg		(1933–2020)	Perry	1984	Union organizer and advocate for women
Lois Anna Barr Cook		(1924–2018)	Montgomery	1985	Pioneering science educator
Mercedes Cotner		(1905–1998)	Cuyahoga	1985	Cleveland City Council member
Zell Draz		(1923–2001)	Mahoning	1985	Associate publisher of the Warren Tribune-Chronicle
Barbara Easterling		(1933–)	Summit	1985	First woman elected to executive committee positions at Communications Workers of America (CWA) and the AFL–CIO
Nikki Giovanni		(1943–)	Hamilton	1985	Poet, writer, commentator, activist, and educator
Aurora Gonzalez		(1924–1991)	Lucas	1985	Organizer, educator and activist in Toledo's Hispanic community
Mary K. Lazarus		(1929–)	Franklin	1985	Advocate for consumer rights, child safety, education, services to women and ethics in government
Barbara Mandel		(1925–2019)	Cuyahoga	1985	President of the National Council of Jewish Women (NCJW)
Norma Marcere		(1908–2004)	Stark	1985	Pioneer feminist and educator
Lucille Middleton		(1919–2009)	Champaign	1985	Established the first classes for developmentally disabled children in Champaign County
Helen Mulholland		(1902–1995)	Franklin	1985	Founding member of the Ohio Commission on the Status of Women and Ohio Women, Inc.
Lauretta Schimmoler		(1900–1981)	Crawford	1985	Aviator who was the first woman in the United States to establish an airport in the United States, the first woman to command an American Legion post and was the founder of the Aerial Nurse Corps of America, the predecessor of the flight nurses of the United States Air Force.
Marge Schott		(1928–2004)	Hamilton	1985	Managing general partner, president and CEO of the National League's Cincinnati Reds franchise from 1984 to 1999
Mary Jen Steinbrenner		(–1996)	Cuyahoga	1985	Developed programs to benefit women and children
Margaret Andrew		(1908–2000)	Montgomery	1986	Pioneer for women in science and technology
Kathleen L. Barber		(1924–2014)	Cuyahoga	1986	Educator and political activist
Fay Biles		(1927–2020)	Portage	1986	First woman vice president of an Ohio university
Elizabeth Blackwell		(1821–1910)	Hamilton	1986	First woman to receive a medical degree in the United States and a pioneer in promoting the education of women as well as social and moral reform
Marie Clarke		(1915–2020)	Franklin	1986	Black female labor leader
Eva Mae Crosby		(1911–2002)	Franklin	1986	Educator, lawyer and race relations pioneer
Ruby Dee		(1922–2014)	Cuyahoga	1986	Actress, poet, playwright, screenwriter, journalist, and activist
Cynthia Drennan		(1948–)	Cuyahoga	1986	Missionary to El Salvador
Hooker Glendinning		(1920–1985)	Cuyahoga	1986	Advocate for social justice, racial and cultural equality
Louise Herring		(1909–1987)	Hamilton	1986	One of the pioneer leaders of the not-for-profit cooperative credit union movement in the United States; known as the "Mother of Credit Unions"
Katherine LeVeque		(1926–2014)	Franklin	1986	Columbus businesswoman
Ruth Ratner Miller		(1925–1996)	Cuyahoga	1986	First woman health director for the city of Cleveland
Amelia Nava		(1933–)	Seneca	1986	Advocate for migrant farmworkers
Arline Webb Pratt		(1872–1966)	Stark	1986	Advocate for illumination of the Statue of Liberty
Anastasia Ann Przelomski		(1918–2001)	Mahoning	1986	Journalist and editor
Virginia Purdy			Adams	1986	Radio entrepreneur and founder of WRAC
Selma Walker		(1925–1997)	Franklin	1986	Founder and director of the Native American Indian Center of Columbus
Julia Montgomery Walsh		(1923–2003)	Summit	1986	First woman Governor of the American Stock Exchange
Faye Wattleton		(1943–)	Montgomery	1986	First African-American and youngest President ever elected to Planned Parenthood; President of the Center for the Advancement of Women
Mary Ellen Withrow		(1930–)	Marion	1986	40th Treasurer of the United States from March 1, 1994, to January 20, 2001, under President Bill Clinton
Anna Biggins		(1933–)	Trumbull	1988	Union organizer
Patricia Clonch		(1933–2024)	Lawrence	1988	Executive Director of the Lawrence County Chamber of Commerce and the Lawrence Economic Development Corporation
Norma Craden		(1919–1992)	Lucas	1988	Union organizer with the Coalition of Labor Union Women
Jewel Freeman Graham		(1925–2015)	Greene	1988	Attorney, professor and President of the World YWCA
Cathy Guisewite		(1950–)	Montgomery	1988	Cartoonist who created the comic strip Cathy
Rebecca D. Jackson		(1955–2022)	Franklin	1988	Medical researcher specializing in endocrinology, osteoporosis and metabolic bone disease
Carol Heiss Jenkins		(1940–)	Summit	1988	Figure skater. 1960 Olympic Champion in Ladies Singles, 1956 Olympic silver medalist and five-time World Champion (1956–1960)
Carol Kane		(1953–)	Cuyahoga	1988	American actress who appeared in Hester Street and Annie Hall. Received two Emmy Awards for her work in the television series Taxi
Bea Larsen		(1929–)	Hamilton	1988	First woman president of the Cincinnati Bar Association
Alice Raful Lev		(1925–2016)	Mahoning	1988	Community organizer and advocate for social justice
Linda Rocker Sogg		(1940–)	Cuyahoga	1988	Advocate for social justice who led the Ohio Coalition for the Ratification of the Equal Rights Amendment
Eleanor Smeal		(1939–)	Ashtabula	1988	Feminist activist, political analyst, lobbyist, and grassroots organizer. President and founder of the Feminist Majority Foundation, serving twice as president of the National Organization for Women
Carolyn Utz		(1913–2005)	Franklin	1988	Music educator and youth advocate
Anita Smith Ward			Franklin	1988	First woman to be elected Chair of a state university board of trustees in Ohio
Jeanette Grasselli Brown		(1928–)	Cuyahoga	1989	Industrial researcher for BP America
Maxine Carnahan		(1922–2019)	Coshocton	1989	First woman president of the United Paperworkers International Union
Tracy Chapman		(1964–)	Cuyahoga	1989	Singer-songwriter, best known for her singles "Fast Car", "Talkin' 'bout a Revolution", "Baby Can I Hold You", "Crossroads", "Give Me One Reason" and "Telling Stories". She is a multi-platinum and four-time Grammy Award-winning artist.
Betsy Mix Cowles		(1810–1876)	Ashtabula	1989	Early leader in the United States abolitionist movement
Ann Gazelle		(1947–)	Franklin	1989	Social worker and artist
Michelle Graves		(1951–)	Hamilton	1989	Banker and financial planner
Florence Harshman		(1930–)	Mahoning	1989	Social worker
June Hutt			Cuyahoga	1989	Publisher and advocate of working women
Geraldine Jensen			Lucas	1989	Founder of the Association for Children for the Enforcement of Support
Carolyn Mahoney		(1946–)	Franklin	1989	Mathematics educator
Linda James Myers		(1947–)	Franklin	1989	Researcher and psychotherapist
Jennie Porter		(1879–1936)	Hamilton	1989	First black female public school principal in Cincinnati
Diane Poulton			Franklin	1989	Advocate for the rights of women
Renee Powell		(1946–)	Stark	1989	Professional golfer who played on the LPGA Tour and is currently head professional at her family's Clearview Golf Club in East Canton, Ohio
Charlene Spretnak		(1946–)	Franklin	1989	Author, activist, academic, and feminist
Charlene Ventura			Hamilton	1989	President and CEO of the YWCA of Greater Cincinnati
Marilyn Gaston		(1939–)	Hamilton	1990	Pediatrician who helped to establish the Comprehensive Sickle Cell Center at the University of Cincinnati
Dorothy Jackson		(1933–2021)	Summit	1990	Akron's Deputy Mayor for Intergovernmental Relations
Luella Talmadge Jackson		(1907–2003)	Seneca	1990	Community activist
Janet Kalven		(1913–2014)	Hamilton	1990	Feminist educator, author and activist
Rosabeth Kanter		(1943–)	Cuyahoga	1990	Tenured professor in business at Harvard Business School, where she holds the Ernest C. Arbuckle Professorship.
Maggie Kuhn		(1905–1995)	Cuyahoga	1990	Activist known for founding the Gray Panthers
Joan Lamson			Cuyahoga	1990	Small business owner
Maya Ying Lin		(1959–)	Athens	1990	Architect and artist working in sculpture and landscape art; best known as the designer of the Vietnam Veterans Memorial in Washington, D.C.
Anne Variano Macko			Cuyahoga	1990	Union organizer with the Communications Workers of America
Alicia Mott		(1944–)	Wood	1990	Advocate for the educational and economic advancement of Ohio's Hispanic community
Ludel Sauvageot		(1906–1996)	Summit	1990	Pioneer in the field of hospital public relations
Fanchon bat-Lillian Shur			Hamilton	1990	Choreographer and educator
Phebe Temperance Sutliff		(1859–1955)	Trumbull	1990	President of Rockford College
Grayce Williams		(1919–2002)	Franklin	1990	First Black woman to serve as President of the Columbus YWCA
Berenice Abbott		(1898–1991)	Clark	1991	Photographer best known for her black-and-white photography of New York City architecture and urban design of the 1930s
Earladeen Badger		(1930–2015)	Hamilton	1991	Founder and president of United Services for Effective Parenting
Hallie Brown		(1849–1949)	Greene	1991	African American educator, writer and activist
JoAnn Davidson		(1927–2024)	Franklin	1991	Speaker and Minority Whip of the Ohio House of Representatives
Raquel Diaz-Sprague			Franklin	1991	Chemist and advocate for women and ethical workplaces
Rita Dove		(1952–)	Summit	1991	United States Poet Laureate and Consultant in Poetry at the Library of Congress
Mary Ignatia Gavin		(1889–1966)	Summit	1991	Founded the first alcohol addiction treatment center; Sister Ignatia was known as the "Angel of Alcoholics Anonymous"
Sara J. Harper		(1926–)	Cuyahoga	1991	First African American woman to graduate from Case Western Reserve University Law School and the first woman to serve on the judiciary of the U.S. Marine Corps Reserve. Harper co-founded the first victims' rights program in the United States.
Donna Hawk		(1943–2015)	Cuyahoga	1991	Developed transitional housing for the homeless
June Holley			Athens	1991	Co-founder of Worker Owned Network. Holley pioneered developing worker-owned cooperatives to alleviate poverty in Appalachia.
Martha C. Moore		(1918–2009)	Guernsey	1991	Active volunteer with the Ohio Republican Party
Darlene Owens		(1947–2000)	Cuyahoga	1991	First woman pipefitter in Ohio
Helen H. Peterson		(1902–1998)	Franklin	1991	Board member of the national YWCA and advocate for minimum wage in Ohio
Martha Pituch		(1932–)	Lucas	1991	Health care educator and advocate for children, families and those without housing
Yvonne Pointer		(1952–)	Cuyahoga	1991	Founder of the Positive Plus Support Group. Pointer spearheaded an effort to bring midnight basketball to Cleveland.
Virginia Ruehlmann		(1924–2008)	Hamilton	1991	Former first lady of Cincinnati; administrator and director with the Helen Steiner Rice Foundation
Josephine Schwarz		(1908–2004)	Montgomery	1991	Dance instructor and co-founder of the Schwarz School of Dance
Suzanne Timken		(1939–)	Stark	1991	Youth fitness advocate and vice chair of the President"s Council on Physical Fitness and Sports Advisory Board
Nancy Vertrone Bieniek		(1941–2014)	Cuyahoga	1991	Businesswoman and founder of Original Copy Centers
Stella Marie Zannoni		(1918–1999)	Cuyahoga	1991	Preserver of Italian American cultural heritage
Mary of the Annunciation Beaumont		(1818–1881)	Cuyahoga	1992	Religion and community services
Antoinette Eaton		(1931–2023)	Mahoning	1992	Math, science and health services
Rubie McCullough		(1918–1995)	Cuyahoga	1992	Religion and community services
Nancy Oakley		(1933–)	Cuyahoga	1992	Religion and community services
Harriet Parker			Franklin	1992	Math, science and health services
Susan Porter			Allen	1992	Arts, music and journalism
Helen Steiner Rice		(1900–1981)	Lorain	1992	Writer of religious and inspirational poetry
Alice Schille		(1869–1955)	Franklin	1992	Watercolorist and painter
Louella Thompson		(1925–2005)	Butler	1992	Religion and community services
Mildred Benson		(1905–2002)	Lucas	1993	Journalist and author of children's books, including the earliest Nancy Drew mysteries
Amelia Bingham		(1869–1927)	Defiance	1993	Stage actress
Virginia Coffey		(1904–2003)	Hamilton	1993	Women's suffrage and cultural activism
Viola Famiano Colombi			Cuyahoga	1993	Religion and community services
Ivy Gunter		(1950–)	Sandusky	1993	Amputee, fashion model, osteosarcoma survivor, inspirational speaker, and fitness enthusiast
Virginia Hamilton		(1934–2002)	Greene	1993	Author of children's books and winner of the National Book Award for Young People's Literature and the Newbery Medal
Lucy Webb Hayes		(1831–1889)	Ross	1993	First Lady of the United States and the wife of President Rutherford B. Hayes
Joy Alice Hintz		(1926–2009)	Muskingum	1993	Religion and community services
Geraldine Macelwane		(1909–1974)	Lucas	1993	First woman judge on the Lucas County Common Pleas Court.
Anne O'Hare McCormick		(1880–1954)	Franklin	1993	Foreign news correspondent for The New York Times
Rena Olshansky		(1934–2023)	Cuyahoga	1993	Arts, music and journalism
Edna Pincham		(1936–2009)	Mahoning	1993	Religion and community services
Maxine Plummer		(1930–)	Jackson	1993	Religion and community services
Jean Reilly		(1918–2013)	Franklin	1993	Religion and community services
Pauline Riel		(1923–2004)	Morrow	1993	Education
Christine M. Cook		(1956–)	Franklin	1994	First woman of the Ohio National Guard to assume command of two separate battalions and then a regiment; Director of the Ohio Veteran's Home
Claudia Coulton		(1947–)	Cuyahoga	1994	Education
Ellen Walker Craig-Jones		(1906–2000)	Franklin	1994	Government and military service
Nanette Ferrall		(1960–)	Auglaize	1994	Math, science and health services
Jill Harms Griesse		(1939–2014)	Licking	1994	Sports and athletics
Georgia Griffith		(1931–2005)	Franklin	1994	Arts, music and journalism
Florence Melton		(1911–2007)	Franklin	1994	Inventor known for innovating the foam-soled and washable slipper.
Lucille Nussdorfer		(1910–2002)	Tuscarawas	1994	Religion and community services
Jane Reece		(1868–1961)	Montgomery	1994	Pictorial photographer of the early 20th century
Emma Ann Reynolds		(1862–1917)	Ross	1994	Math, science and health services
Carol Scott			Clark	1994	Religion and community services
Paula Spence		(1932–2020)	Franklin	1994	Business and labor
Deanna Tribe		(1947–)	Vinton	1994	Women's suffrage and cultural activism
Lillian Wald		(1867–1940)	Hamilton	1994	Nurse, social worker, public health official, teacher, author, editor, publisher, activist for peace, women's, children's and civil rights, and the founder of American community nursing
Sandra Beckwith		(1943–)	Hamilton	1995	Judge; first woman to sit on the United States District Court for the Southern District of Ohio
Daeida Wilcox Beveridge		(1861–1914)	Defiance	1995	Business and labor
Patricia Ann Blackmon		(1950–)	Cuyahoga	1995	Law
Mary Bowermaster		(1917–2011)	Butler	1995	Nurse's aide for schools in Butler County and masters athlete
Christine Brennan		(1958–)	Lucas	1995	Sports columnist, TV and radio commentator, bestselling author and nationally known speaker
Joy Garrison Cauffman		(1927–2020)	Clinton	1995	Math, science and health services
Bunny Cowan Clark		(1935–2015)	Franklin	1995	Math, science and health services
Grace L. Drake		(1926–2020)	Cuyahoga	1995	Government and military service
Naomi J. Evans			Franklin	1995	Math, science and health services
Frances Dana Gage		(1808–1884)	Hamilton	1995	Women's suffrage and cultural activism
Jayne Kirkham			Cuyahoga	1995	Arts, music and journalism
Sylvia Lewis		(1927–2022)	Summit	1995	Women's Suffrage and Cultural Activism
Tami Longaberger		(1964–)	Licking	1995	Business and labor
Donna Moon			Montgomery	1995	Business and labor
Gratia Murphy		(–1994)	Mahoning	1995	Education
Alice Robie Resnick		(1939–)	Lucas	1995	Justice of the Supreme Court of Ohio
Muriel Siebert		(1928–2013)	Cuyahoga	1995	First woman to own a seat on the New York Stock Exchange and the first woman to head one of its member firms
Carol Cartwright		(1941–)	Portage	1996	Academic administrator and former president of Bowling Green State University
Elizabeth Evans			Franklin	1996	Radio broadcaster
Rae Natalie Prosser de Goodall		(1935–2015)	Morrow	1996	Math, science and health services
Elizabeth Hauser		(1873–1958)	Trumbull	1996	Women's suffrage and cultural activism
Bernadine Healy		(1944–2011)	Franklin	1996	Physician, cardiologist, academic and a former head of the National Institutes of Health (NIH)
Carol Kelly		(1939–2017)	Union	1996	Education
Fannie Lewis		(1926–2008)	Cuyahoga	1996	Religion and community services
Betty Montgomery		(1948–)	Wood	1996	Republican politician who served as Ohio State Auditor
Hope Taft			Hamilton	1996	First Lady of Ohio and wife to Governor Bob Taft
Carol Ball		(1941—2023)	Darke	1997	Arts, music and journalism
Marilyn Byers		(1931–)	Ashland	1997	Government and military service
Jean Murrell Capers		(1913–2017)	Cuyahoga	1997	Law
Martha Dorsey		(1930–2018)	Clermont	1997	Government and military service
Joan Heidelberg		(1932–2020)	Miami	1997	Math, science and health services
Clarice Herbert		(1916–2006)	Allen	1997	Religion and community services
Beatrice Lampkin		(1934–2022)	Hamilton	1997	Math, science and health services
Jacquelyn Mayer Townsend		(1942–)	Erie	1997	Math, science and health services
Ann O'Rourke			Franklin	1997	Religion and community services
Beryl Rothschild		(1928–2016)	Cuyahoga	1997	Government and military service
Thekla Shackelford		(1932–)	Franklin	1997	Education
Marianne Boggs Campbell		(1926–2024)	Gallia	1998	Business and labor
Carole Garrison		(1942–)	Summit	1998	Women's suffrage and cultural activism
Nancy Hollister		(1949–)	Muskingum	1998	66th Governor of Ohio
Stephanie J. Jones			Cuyahoga	1998	Lawyer and educator, president of Stephanie Jones Strategies and former executive director of the National Urban League Policy Institute
Bettye Ruth Kay		(1929–1996)	Lucas	1998	Religion and community services
Barbara Ross-Lee		(1942–)	Athens	1998	Dean of the Ohio University of Osteopathic Medicine
Audrey Mackiewicz		(1924–2009)	Erie	1998	Arts, music and journalism
Kathy Palasics		(1924–2004)	Cuyahoga	1998	Arts, music and journalism
Margaret Diane Quinn		(1951–)	Muskingum	1998	Government and military service
Henrietta Buckler Seiberling		(1888–1979)	Summit	1998	Religion and community services
Mary Emily Taylor			Logan	1998	Education
Virginia Varga		(1929–)	Montgomery	1998	Education
Jacqueline Woods			Cuyahoga	1998	Business and labor
Nancy L. Zimpher		(1946–)	Franklin	1998	Education
Mary Jo Behrensmeyer			Knox	1999	Education
Alvina Costilla		(1926–)	Lucas	1999	Women's suffrage and cultural activism
Sarah Deal		(1969–)	Wood	1999	First female Marine selected for Naval aviation training, and subsequently the Marine Corps' first female aviator in 1993
Electra Doren		(1861–1927)	Montgomery	1999	Education
Daisy Flowers			Franklin	1999	Religion and community services
Annie Glenn		(1920–2020)	Muskingum	1999	Wife of former astronaut and Senator John Glenn
Ann Hamilton		(1956–)	Franklin	1999	Artist known for her installations, textile art and sculptures
Carole Hoover		(1943–)	Cuyahoga	1999	Business and labor
Cheryl Han Horn		(1952–)	Franklin	1999	Business and labor
Carol Latham		(1939–)	Cuyahoga	1999	Business and labor
Nancy Linenkugel		(1950–)	Erie	1999	Math, science and health services
Marie Barrett Marsh		(1919–1997)	Trumbull	1999	Government and military service
Marjorie Parham		(1918–2021)	Hamilton	1999	Arts, music and journalism
Mary Regula		(1926–2018)	Stark	1999	Religion and community services
Lee Lenore Rubin			Athens	1999	Religion and community services
Harriet Beecher Stowe		(1811–1896)	Hamilton	1999	Abolitionist and author who wrote Uncle Tom's Cabin (1852)
Jerry Sue Thornton		(1949–)	Cuyahoga	1999	Education
Janet Voinovich			Cuyahoga	1999	Government and military service
Paige Palmer-Ashbaugh		(1916–2009)	Summit	2000	Sports and athletics
Maude Charles Collins		(1893–1972)	Vinton	2000	Government and military service
Faye Dambrot		(1935–2000)	Summit	2000	Education
Margarita De Leon		(1957–)	Lucas	2000	Women's suffrage and cultural activism
Patricia Louise Fletcher			Jefferson	2000	Women's suffrage and cultural activism
Jean Patrice Harrington		(1922–2017)	Hamilton	2000	Education
Shirley Hoffman		(1920–2014)	Cuyahoga	2000	Math, science and health services
Dorothy Kazel		(1939–1980)	Cuyahoga	2000	Ursuline nun and missionary to El Salvador
Farah Majidzadeh		(1938–)	Franklin	2000	Business and labor
Ada Martin		(1949–2000)	Franklin	2000	Religion and community services
Lorle Porter		(1938–)	Knox	2000	Education
Lanna Samaniego		(1943–)	Mercer	2000	Women's suffrage and cultural activism
Yvonne Walker-Taylor		(1931–2006)	Greene	2000	Education
Margaret W. Wong		(1950–)	Cuyahoga	2000	Law
Betty Zane		(1759–1823)	Belmont	2000	Alleged heroine of the American Revolutionary War
Rebecca Boreczky		(1952–)	Delaware	2001	Religion and community services
Frances Jennings Casement		(1840–1928)	Lake	2001	Suffragette
Ruth L. Davis		(1910–2005)	Lucas	2001	First woman President of Davis College
Lucille Ford		(1921–)	Ashland	2001	Education
Susan F. Gray		(1934–)	Darke	2001	Educator, advocate for historical preservation and Darke County Park Commissioner
Kathleen V. Harrison		(1959–)	Franklin	2001	Lieutenant colonel in the Marine Corps
Adella Prentiss Hughes		(1869–1950)	Cuyahoga	2001	Pianist and impresario; main organizer of the Cleveland Orchestra
Janet E. Jackson			Franklin	2001	Assistant Attorney General for Ohio and the first African-American woman to serve as judge in Franklin County
Dorothy Kamenshek		(1925–2010)	Hamilton	2001	Sports and athletics
Maxine Levin		(1916–2002)	Cuyahoga	2001	Religion and community services
Irene D. Long		(1950–2020)	Cuyahoga	2001	Physician and NASA official. Long was the first female Chief Medical Officer at the Kennedy Space Center.
Martha MacDonell		(1930–2020)	Allen	2001	Religion and community services
Mary Andrew Matesich		(1939–2005)	Franklin	2001	Education
Elizabeth Powell		(1902–2007)	Mahoning	2001	Reverend Mother and founder of the World Fellowship Interdenominational Church
Deborah Pryce		(1951–)	Franklin	2001	Former Republican member of the United States House of Representatives for Ohio's 15th congressional district
Maria Sexton		(1918–2008)	Wayne	2001	Sports and athletics
Farah Walters		(1945–)	Cuyahoga	2001	Business and labor
Georgeta Blebea Washington		(1953–)	Cuyahoga	2001	Women's suffrage and cultural activism
Judy Barker			Franklin	2002	Business and labor
Frances Seiberling Buchholzer		(1934–)	Summit	2002	Government and military service
Joan Brown Campbell		(1931–)	Cuyahoga	2002	Religion and community services
Nancy Frankenberg		(1912–2002)	Delaware	2002	Religion and community services
Zell Hart-Deming		(1869–1936)	Trumbull	2002	Business and labor
Elsie Helsel		(1915–2012)	Athens	2002	Religion and community services
Katie Horstman		(1935–)	Auglaize	2002	Sports and athletics
Jennie Hwang		(1949–)	Cuyahoga	2002	Math, science and health services
Cathy Monroe Lewis			Cuyahoga	2002	Religion and community services
Viola Startzman Robertson		(1914–2013)	Wayne	2002	Math, science and health services
Stefanie Spielman		(1967–2009)	Franklin	2002	Sports reporter and breast cancer survivor
Kathryn Sullivan		(1951–)	Franklin	2002	Geologist and former NASA astronaut. Sullivan is the first American woman to walk in space.
Sheila G. Bailey			Cuyahoga	2003	Math, science and health services
Jeraldyne Blunden		(1940–1999)	Montgomery	2003	Arts, music and journalism
Shannon K. Carter			Hamilton	2003	Religion and community services
Luceille Fleming		(1924–2015)	Franklin	2003	Government and military service
Olga D. González-Sanabria			Cuyahoga	2003	Math, science and health services
Elsie Janis		(1889–1956)	Franklin	2003	Singer, songwriter, actress, and screenwriter
Lois Lenski		(1893–1974)	Shelby	2003	Writer of children's and young adult fiction
Ellen Mosley-Thompson		(1952–)	Franklin	2003	Math, science and health services
Cathy Nelson			Franklin	2003	Women's suffrage and cultural activism
Evlyn Gray Scott		(1903–2000)	Cuyahoga	2003	Math, science and health services
Yvonne C. Williams			Wayne	2003	Women's suffrage and cultural activism
Margaret Brugler Rogers		(1922–2005)	Franklin	2007	Religion and community services
Julia Chatfield		(1809–1878)	Brown	2007	Education
Lucille Hastings			Holmes	2007	Religion and community services
Lillie Howard			Montgomery	2007	Education
Mary Ann Jorgenson			Cuyahoga	2007	Law
Joyce "Snowfeather" Mahaney		(1947–2006)	Lucas	2007	Religion and community services
Rozella M. Schlotfeldt		(1914–2005)	Cuyahoga	2007	Math, science and health services
Katherine May Smith		(1974–)	Hocking	2007	Basketball player; Ohio State Female Athlete of the Century
Florence Wang			Mahoning	2007	Religion and community services
Dorothy Baunach			Cuyahoga	2008	Business and labor
Carrie Nelson Black		(1859–1936)	Franklin	2008	Math, science and health services, founded the Columbus Society for the Prevention and Control of Tuberculosis (now known as The Breathing Association) in 1906.
Caro Bosca		(1922–2007)	Clark	2008	Government and military service
Yvette McGee Brown		(1960–)	Franklin	2008	President of the Center for Children and Family Advocacy at Nationwide Children's Hospital
Loann Crane		(1925–2021)	Franklin	2008	Women's suffrage and cultural activism
Joan Durgin		(1942–2022)	Lucas	2008	Education
Carol Gibbs			Hamilton	2008	Religion and community services
Billie Johnson			Lucas	2008	Religion and community services
Jih-Fen Lei			Cuyahoga	2008	Math, science and health services
Elizabeth Stewart Magee		(1889–1972)	Cuyahoga	2008	Business and labor
Kasturi Rajadhyaksha		(1923/24–2010)	Franklin	2008	Women's suffrage and cultural activism
Julie Salamon		(1953–)	Adams	2008	Journalist, critic and author
Michele G. Wheatly			Greene	2008	Education
Gail Collins		(1945–)	Hamilton	2009	Journalist, op-ed columnist and author, most recognized for her work with The New York Times
Pamela B. Davis			Cuyahoga	2009	Dean and Vice President for Medical Affairs of the Case Western Reserve University School of Medicine
Kim de Groh			Cuyahoga	2009	Math, science and health services
Beverly J. Gray			Ross	2009	Educator
Sharon Howard			Montgomery	2009	Religion and community services
Carol Kuhre			Athens	2009	Religion and community services
Virginia Manning			Erie	2009	Business and labor
Helen Moss		(1936–2013)	Cuyahoga	2009	Women's suffrage and cultural activism
Judith Rycus			Franklin	2009	Religion and community services
Mary Adelaide Sandusky		(1874–1964)	Lucas	2009	Religion and community services
Glenna Watson			Franklin	2009	Government and military service
Bernett Williams			Summit	2009	Religion and community services
Celia Williamson			Lucas	2009	University of Toledo Professor and community advocate who seeks to combat domestic human trafficking and prostitution.
Alvarene Owens			Montgomery	2010	Law
Gayle Channing Tenenbaum		(1944–2023)	Franklin	2010	Math, science and health services
Dorothy Maguire		(1918–1981)	Lorain	2010	Sports and athletics
Barbara Fergus			Franklin	2010	Arts, music and journalism
Merle G. Kearns		(1938–2014)	Ottawa	2010	Government and military service
Rebecca J. Lee			Pickaway	2010	Executive Director of the Pickaway County Veteran Service Commission
Nina McClelland		(1929–2020)	Lucas	2010	Math, science and health services
Lana Moresky			Cuyahoga	2010	Women's suffrage and cultural activism
Martha Potter Otto		(1942–)	Knox	2010	Math, science and health services
Elizabeth Ruppert		(1936–2023)	Lucas	2010	Math, science and health services
Rita Singh			Cuyahoga	2010	Business and labor
Cheryl A. Boyce		(1949–2020)	Franklin	2011	Health services
Elizabeth H. Flick		(1935–)	Franklin	2011	Community and military service
Frances Ellen Watkins Harper		(1825–1911)		2011	African-American abolitionist, poet and author. Harper published her first book of poetry at age 20 and her first novel, the widely praised Iola Leroy, at age 67.
Brenda Hollis			Henry	2011	Military service and law
Mary C. Juhas		(1955–)	Franklin	2011	Science and education
Kleia R. Luckner		(1945–)	Lucas	2011	Health service and law
Valerie J. Lyons			Lorain	2011	Science
Linda S. Noelker			Cuyahoga	2011	Community service and health service
Carrie Vonderhaar			Hamilton	2011	Arts and conservation
