= Helen Black =

Helen Black may refer to:

- Helen Black (writer), English screenwriter
- Helen Cecelia Black (1838–1906), English journalist
- Helen Chatfield Black (1924–2018), American naturalist and conservationist
- Helen Marie Black (1896–1988), American business manager, journalist, and publicist
- Helen Black (mayoress) (1896–1963), New Zealand mayoress and community worker
