= Geraldine Macelwane =

American judge

Geraldine Macelwane (1909–1974) was the first woman judge on the Lucas County Common Pleas Court in Ohio.

== Biography ==
Geraldine F. Connell was born in 1909 in Detroit, Michigan to Jeremiah and Mary Connell. The family moved to Toledo, Ohio, in 1924. She graduated from high school in 1926 and became a statistical clerk for the Wambash Railroad until she lost the position during the Great Depression. She was admitted to the Ohio Bar in 1932 before receiving her degree from the University of Toledo. In 1938, she married architect John P. Macelwane, with whom she had two daughters.

In 1937, Macelwane became a prosecutor for Lucas County, specializing in child neglect cases. She was elected to the Toledo Municipal Court as the first woman judge in 1952. In 1956, she was appointed to the Lucas County Common Pleas Court by Governor Frank Lausche, a position she held until her death in 1974. By 1958, she had an all-woman court staff; her clerks included Marigene Valiquette and Mary Ann Fackelman. As a judge, she developed the individual docket system and jury instructions.

Macelwane died of a heart attack on December 9, 1974. She was posthumously inducted into the Ohio Women's Hall of Fame in 1993.
