= Kathleen L. Barber =

American political scientist

Kathleen L. Barber (1924–2014) was an American political scientist and environmental activist. She was a professor at John Carroll University near Cleveland, Ohio, and the author of two books on voting systems.

== Life and academic career ==
Barber was originally from Canton, Ohio, born in 1924. She was an undergraduate at Wellesley College, where she graduated in 1944. She became a housewife, and raised four children, returning to graduate study only after the youngest reached school age. She earned a master's degree and Ph.D. from Case Western Reserve University, despite opposition from a faculty member who predicted that "Shaker Heights housewives always drop out".

She became a professor of political science at John Carroll University, starting there in 1968, and chaired the department from 1977 until 1985. She retired in 1989, and died on June 25, 2014.

== Environmental activism ==
In the 1960s, as a graduate student, Barber became active in the movement to save the Shaker Lakes from highway development. These are two reservoirs in Shaker Heights, Ohio, formed in the 19th century by damming a local stream. In the 1960s, an extension of the Interstate Highway System named the Clark Highway (to be numbered as I-290) was planned to pass through this area. Barber helped lead the successful campaign to prevent this construction, and became a founder of the Nature Center at Shaker Lakes. She continued to remain active in local politics into the 1990s.

== Recognition ==
Barber was elected to the Ohio Women's Hall of Fame in 1986. Her biography in the Hall of Fame states that her "work in the fields of education and politics ... made a profound impact in the Cleveland community".

== Books ==
Barber was the author of:

- Proportional Representation and Election Reform in Ohio (Ohio State University Press, 1995)
- A Right to Representation: Proportional Election Systems for the Twenty-first Century (Ohio State University Press, 2000)
