= Rose Papier =

American gerontologist and social work official (1912–2000)

- Born: Rose Locumovitz (later shortened to Locum); November 29, 1912; St. Marys, Ohio
- Died: August 9, 2000 (aged 87); Columbus, Ohio
- Other names: Rose L. Papier
- Occupation: gerontological administrator
- Years active: 1960-1983
- Known for: Pioneering the Ohio Administration on Aging

Rose Papier (November 29, 1912 – August 9, 2000) was an Ohio social administrator who worked in several departments throughout the state, including the Department of Mental Health and Retardation, the Ohio Commission on Aging, and headed the Ohio Administration on Aging when it was created in 1965. She was one of the inaugural inductees into the Ohio Women's Hall of Fame in 1978.

== Early life ==
Rose Locumovitz was born on November 29, 1912, in St. Marys, Ohio to Harry and Maisha Locumovitz, who had immigrated to the country from Russia. Soon thereafter, they shortened the surname to Locum and moved to Wapakoneta, Ohio. They were Jewish, and her father peddled goods from a pushcart to support his eight children. After graduating from high school, Locum worked as a fur coat model in Cleveland. While modeling, she met Bill Papier through her sister Lena, and they married soon after. One of his conditions of marriage was that Locum obtain a college education. She enrolled in Ohio State University,, earning a BS in 1940 and a master's degree in Social Administration in 1943. While raising her family, Papier did volunteer work with the Columbus Council of Jewish Women and Hadassah, as well as the Columbus Symphony Orchestra and the League of Women Voters.

== Career ==
When her children were grown, Papier went to work for the Ohio State Department of Mental Health and Retardation, serving as research director. In 1960, she authored and edited Ohio Senior Citizens and, the following year, served as Ohio's delegate to the White House Conference on Aging. By 1962, she was serving as the State Secretary of Ohio's Commission on Aging and organizing volunteer visits to nursing homes for older adults. She organized the first five Governor's Conferences on Aging and coordinated Golden Age Villages, in Columbus and Toledo, facilitating the planning, construction, and services as a consultant to the Department of Mental Hygiene and Correction. The villages provided low-rent housing and services for elderly Ohioans and people with mental disabilities to help them maintain independent living. The range of services included meals, recreational and educational programs, and health, medical, and social services.

In 1965, Ohio created the Ohio Administration on Aging and selected Papier to head the new agency. In 1971, Papier became secretary of the National Association of State Agencies on Aging and that same year she served as co-chair of the Ohio delegation for the White House Conference on Aging. Throughout the 1970s, she traveled the state and was a featured speaker at many organizations and conferences dealing with elders.

== Recognition ==
In 1978, Papier was inducted into the Ohio Department of Aging Hall of Fame and was among the inaugural women inducted that year into the newly created Ohio Women's Hall of Fame.

== Death ==
Papier died on August 9, 2000, in Columbus, Ohio.
