= Harriet Bracken =

American banker (1919–2010)

Harriet Bracken (May 20, 1919 – March 9, 2010) was the first woman vice president of the Huntington National Bank.

== Biography ==
Harriet Oelgoetz was born on May 20, 1919, in Columbus, Ohio, to Joseph and Ida Oelgoetz.

In 1941, Bracken graduated from the Ohio State University with a BS in journalism. She later became the advertising director for F & R Lazarus Company. In 1966, she became the first woman vice president of the Huntington National Bank where she was responsible for the planning, administration and execution of public relations functions and was a driving force behind the introduction of the automated teller machine (ATM). She retired in 1982.

Bracken was inducted into the Ohio Women's Hall of Fame in 1978.
