= Rebecca D. Jackson =

American professor of endocrinology, diabetes and metabolism

- Born: August 18, 1955
- Died: October 11, 2022 (aged 67)
- Education: Ohio State University
- Known for: Women's Health Initiative
- Awards: Member of the Ohio Women's Hall of Fame; Ohio Woman of the Year; Best Doctor in America
- Scientific career
- Fields: women's health and endocrinology

Rebecca D. Jackson (August 18, 1955 – October 11, 2022) was an American medical researcher, medical practitioner and professor of endocrinology, diabetes and metabolism. Her research was significant in the understanding and treatment of osteoporosis. She also researched the opioid crisis in Ohio.

Jackson was director of the Center for Women's Health, the founding director of the Ohio State University Center for Clinical and Translational Science, associate dean for clinical and translational research, and professor of endocrinology, diabetes, and metabolism at the Ohio State University. In 2008, she was elected as a Fellow of the American Association for the Advancement of Science and received the OSU Distinguished Scholar Award, one of Ohio State University's highest research honors, in 2015.

== Early life ==
Jackson was born in Columbus, Ohio, on August 18, 1955, to William and Dorothy (née Woytowicz) Jackson. She had a brother.

== Education ==
Jackson received her medical degree from Ohio State University College of Medicine in 1978.

== Career ==
Jackson was involved in one of the first studies to show that weight lifting, rather than walking, is more beneficial for maintaining bone density: that the ideal exercise to stimulate bone formation is force rather than repetition. She and her colleagues had also been involved in one of the landmark studies examining bisphosphonates, a new class of medications for treating postmenopausal osteoporosis. She co-authored hundreds of articles that have appeared in publications including American Journal of Preventive Medicine, Arthritis & Rheumatology, Nature, and Nature Communications.

Jackson's research was concentrated in the area of women's health, with a specific focus on defining clinical factors, biomarkers, and genetic associations for diseases that disproportionately affect women (particularly osteoporosis). Her laboratory had continuous NIH funding for almost 30 years and she authored or co-authored more than 250 peer-reviewed manuscripts, including the landmark Women's Health Initiative (WHI) Calcium Plus Vitamin D Trial. She was the vice-chair of the WHI, and was later the principal investigator for the WHI Midwest Regional Field Center. Her work focuses on the epidemiology of chronic disease in women, including cancer, osteoporosis, cardiovascular disease and osteoarthritis.

Jackson spent about thirty percent of her time as a clinician and seventy percent as a researcher. She last practiced at the Center for Women's Health in Columbus, Ohio.

== Injury ==
Jackson had a spinal cord injury in the late 1970s and used a wheelchair since then.

== Later life and death ==
In 2019, Jackson became the lead investigator on a $65 million research study to help reduce deaths from opioid use. She died on October 11, 2022.

== Notable achievements ==
Jackson's work in the field of medicine resulted in a number of awards and honors:

- 1978, American Medical Women's Association Award for Academic Excellence
- 1988, Disabled Professional Woman of the Year Award, Pilot Club
- 1998, elected to Ohio Women's Hall of Fame
- 2003, profiled in "200 Women, 200 Years: Ohio Women of the Year"
- 2008, elected as a Fellow of the American Association for the Advancement of Science
- 2015, OSU Distinguished Scholar Award, one of Ohio State University's highest research honors
- 2017, Best Doctor in America
- YWCA Woman of Achievement
