= Mary C. Juhas =

American engineer (born 1955)

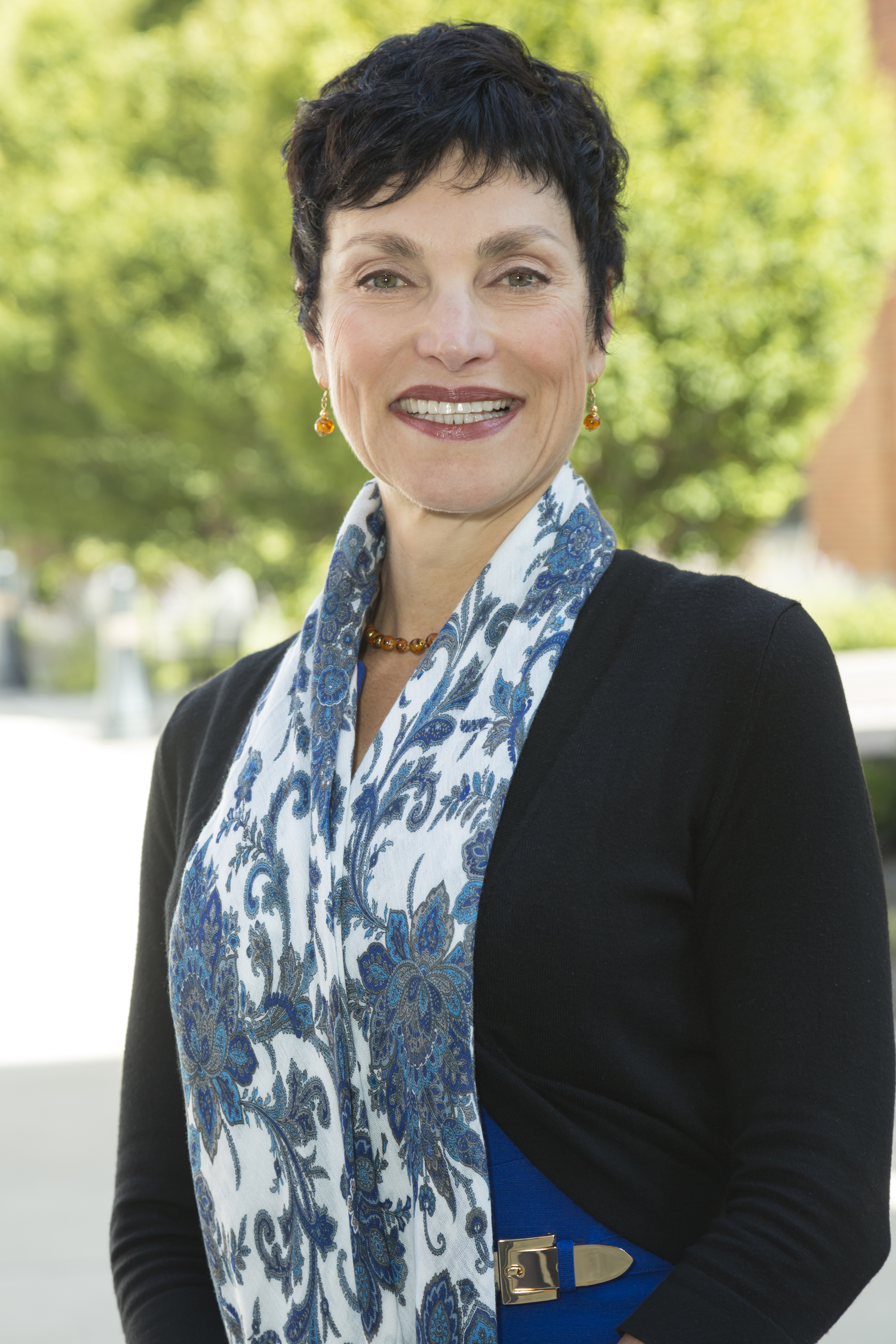
- Born: September 16, 1955 (age 71); Pittsburgh, Pennsylvania, USA
- Spouse: John Lippold

Academic background
- Education: B.S., Chemistry, Seton Hill University; MA., metallurgy and materials science, 1980 Carnegie Mellon University; PhD., Materials Science and Engineering, 1989, Ohio State University
- Thesis: The effect of low temperature isothermal heat treatments on the intergranular corrosion of AISI 316 stainless steel simulated weld heat affected zones (1989)

Academic work
- Institutions: The Ohio State University

Mary Catherine Juhas (born September 16, 1955) is an American engineer. She is an associate vice president in the Office of Research and associate professor of materials science and engineering in the College of Engineering at Ohio State University. She is a Fellow of the American Society for Metals and inducted into the Ohio Women's Hall of Fame.

== Early life ==
Juhas was born on September 16, 1955, in Pittsburgh, Pennsylvania to parents Lucille and William alongside two sisters. Both her father William and his father were engineers.

== Education and career ==
After earning her Master's degree from Carnegie Mellon University, Juhas was hired as an engineer by Lawrence Livermore National Laboratory. She stayed in San Francisco for five years before completing her PhD at Ohio State University.

She left North America for France after receiving her PhD to complete her post-doctoral fellowship at the University of Paris. Upon her return, Juhas was hired at the Edison Welding Institute as a senior research engineer and aerospace team leader. In 2002, she was appointed Assistant Dean for Diversity and Outreach at College of Engineering at Ohio State University.

Juhas led the Diversity and Outreach in the Directorate for Engineering at the National Science Foundation from 2006 until 2008. In 2011, Juhas was named chair of the President and Provost's Council on Women and elected to the Ohio Women's Hall of Fame. Alongside Joan Herbers, Juhas was invited to speak at the White House regarding encouraging women to join and stay in STEM fields. Two years later, she was appointed Women in Engineering Pro-Active Network President-Elect. She was also elected a Fellow of the American Society for Metals.

In 2017, The Ohio State University recognized Juhas as a Distinguished Alumni.

== Personal life ==
Juhas met her husband John Lippold while studying at Carnegie Mellon University.
