= Marie Clarke =

American labor leader (1915–2020)

Marie Clarke (June 27, 1915 – January 2, 2020) was an African American labor leader from Ohio. She was inducted into the Ohio Women's Hall of Fame in 1986 by Governor Richard Celeste. She turned 100 in June 2015. Clarke was born in Columbus, Ohio; she died in January 2020 at the age of 104.

== Work and organizing ==
In 1946 Clarke, a single mother, began work as a mechanic at the largest aircraft manufacturer in the United States at the time, Curtiss-Wright Corporation in Columbus, Ohio. Clarke soon became a labor organizer and recruiter for the United Auto Workers union. Her first project took on disparities between the men's and women's restrooms at the plant raising concerns that the men's restroom had many more sinks for washing after shifts than the women's. The difference added to the women's workday as they waited in long lines. It was the long wait times that allowed Clarke to raise awareness and organize women to become part of the union.

Her efforts organizing workers at the plant into the United Auto Workers union survived a major company re-organization from Curtiss-Wright Corporation to North American Rockwell manufacturing company. After 22 years in the aircraft industry, Clarke was the first African American woman to be elected to the executive board of the UAW local 927. In 1969, she left the industry and took a job as a clerical worker at Columbus City Hall where she was supportive of a strike among the city's sanitation workers who were part of the AFSCME Local 1632 union. After the strike, Clarke was instrumental in organizing clerical workers to join the local 1632 union, a task completed by the end of 1969.

From 1980–1992 Clarke served as the secretary-treasurer of the AFSCME Local 1632 union and was a member of the AFSCME Local 1632 Chapter 108 as a retiree. John Lyall, president of AFSCME Ohio Council 8 spoke of Marie Clarke noting that "when we say we are standing on the shoulders of those who came before us, we’re talking about people like Marie Clarke. She knew the power of solidarity and was a great believer in direct action. Her accomplishments should inspire us all." Clarke has said that “I have always felt that serving the public was a special kind of work. And I will always be proud to say I am an AFSCME member."
