= Josephine Irwin =

American suffragist (1890–1984)

Josephine Saxer Irwin
- Born: March 1, 1890; Lakewood, Ohio
- Died: September 15, 1984 (aged 94)
- Occupations: Suffragist, educator
- Awards: Ohio Women's Hall of Fame

Josephine Saxer Irwin (March 1, 1890 – September 15, 1984) was an American suffragist and educator. She worked with numerous suffrage organizations and was a strong advocate for the Equal Rights Amendment. Irwin was inducted into the Ohio Women's Hall of Fame in 1983.

== Biography ==
Irwin was born in Lakewood, Ohio on March 1, 1890. Her father died when she was young, and watching her mother struggle as a single parent inspired her to support the suffrage cause. Irwin graduated from the School of Education in Western Reserve University in 1910. She taught at local elementary schools through 1919.

On October 3, 1914, Irwin participated in a suffrage parade that marched down Euclid Avenue in Cleveland. After the passage of the Nineteenth Amendment to the United States Constitution, which recognized the right of women to vote, she helped form the Cleveland chapter of League of Women Voters. She was also a member of the Women's Equity Action League and the National Organization for Women.

After the end of World War II, she served as chair for the Ohio chapter of the Women's Action Committee for Lasting Peace. She served on the Fairview Park City Council from 1958 to 1962, the first woman to do so. Irwin acknowledged that she was chosen as a token woman and that the other council members ignored her input.

Irwin was a strong advocate for the Equal Rights Amendment (ERA). In February 1975, she gave a "moving speech" to the Ohio Coalition for the Implementation of the Equal Rights Amendment on the need for passage of the amendment. On August 26, 1976, on the 56th anniversary of the certification of the 19th amendment, she repeated her 1914 march down Euclid Avenue in continued support of women's equality. In 1982, at age 92, Irwin lamented that more hadn't been done to pass the ERA.

== Death and legacy ==
Irwin died on September 15, 1984. In honor of her death, Ohio representative Mary Rose Oakar called her a "pioneer and woman of courage".

Irwin was inducted into the Ohio Women's Hall of Fame in 1983 in recognition of her advocacy for women's suffrage.

The Cleveland chapter of the National Organization for Women presents the Josephine Irwin Award to honor women who have contributed to the cause of women's rights.

== See also ==
- Women's suffrage in Ohio
