= Jane Ardmore =

American writer

Jane Kesner Ardmore
- Born: Jane Kesner; 1912; Chicago, Illinois, U.S.
- Died: August 17, 2000 (aged 88)
- Education: University of Chicago (BA, 1932)
- Occupations: Biographer, journalist, novelist
- Writing career
- Period: 1946–1967
- Genres: Biography, fiction
- Notable works: Take My Life (1957); The Dress Doctor (1959); Portrait of Joan (1962)

Jane Kesner Ardmore (1912 — August 17, 2000), also known as Jane Kesner Morris, was a writer in Hollywood, best known for biographies of actors, and for three novels.

== Early life and education ==
Jane Kesner was one of two daughters born to David Leon Kesner and his wife, the former Florence Behrend, in Chicago, Illinois. Jane remembered writing her first popular story at age 10, when her teacher liked her composition so much that she sent copies to every classroom at Jane's school. Kesner attended the University of Chicago, where she was managing editor of the campus newspaper. She graduated from the University of Chicago in 1932. While at Chicago, she was the assigned "big sister" of feminist theologian Janet Kalven, who recalled that Kesner later became "a close friend."

== Career ==
Ardmore worked as a reporter in Hollywood, specializing in celebrity profiles for magazines and newspapers including the Los Angeles Times, Good Housekeeping, and the Saturday Evening Post. Book-length biographies by Ardmore include Take My Life (1957, about and with Eddie Cantor), The Dress Doctor (1959, about and with Edith Head), The Self Enchanted (1959, about Mae Murray), and Portrait of Joan (1962, about and with Joan Crawford).

Ardmore also wrote fiction; her novels were Women Inc. (1946), Julie (1952), and To Love is to Listen (1967).

In 1968 Ardmore was honored by the Theta Sigma Phi professional organization for women in communications, as "National Headliner of 1968."

== Personal life ==
Jane Kesner was married and widowed twice. Her first husband, publicist Ted Morris, died in 1951 after several years of illness. She married her second husband, editor Albert Ardmore, in 1951; the couple had a daughter, Ellen. Jane Kesner Ardmore was widowed from her second marriage in 1993, and died in 2000, at the age of 88, from complications following hip surgery.

An extensive collection of Jane Ardmore's papers is archived at the Margaret Herrick Library of the Academy of Motion Picture Arts and Sciences.
