= Mildred Bayer =

American nurse (1908–1990)

- Born: Mildred L. Mason; December 7, 1908; Weston, Ohio
- Died: October 9, 1990 (aged 81)

Mildred L. Mason Bayer (December 7, 1908 – October 9, 1990) was a registered nurse from Ohio, United States, who was inducted into the Ohio Women's Hall of Fame for her local and international humanitarian work.

== Early life and education ==
Mildred Mason was born on December 7, 1908 in Weston, Ohio. Mason earned a nursing degree from St. Vincent Hospital School of Nursing in 1932 in Toledo, Ohio. Bayer was married to Charles Bayer, a physician.

== Career ==
Bayer founded two clinics in Toledo and Lucas County for migrant farm workers in 1960. Bayer helped establish Mobile Meals in Toledo in 1967, and was the organizations first volunteer coordinator.

In 1970, Bayer began making medical mission trips to Nigeria. Working with the St. Vincent Hospital Grey Nuns, Bayer established a hospital and 23 mobile clinics around Kabba, Nigeria.

In 1984, Bayer founded Health Clinics International (HCI), a non-profit organization based in Toledo, to provide medical care to the homeless and other underserved populations.

Bayer helped pass Ohio state legislation that requires nursing home operators to be licensed.

== Recognition ==
Bayer received the Outstanding Service Award from the Toledo Educational Association for the Aged and Chronically Ill in 1969. And Mary Manse College honored her with the Stella Maris Award.

== Later life and death ==
Bayer died on October 9, 1990.
