= Jewel Freeman Graham =

American lawyer (1925–2015)

- Born: Precious Jewel Freeman; May 3, 1925; Springfield, Ohio
- Died: November 30, 2015 (aged 90); Yellow Springs, Ohio
- Education: B.S., sociology and psychology, Fisk University; M.S., social service administration, Case Western Reserve University; Juris Doctor, University of Dayton
- Occupations: Professor of social work and legal studies
- Years active: 1969–1986
- Employer: Antioch College
- Known for: President, World YWCA (1987–1991)
- Spouse: Paul Nathaniel Graham (m. 1953)
- Children: 2
- Parent(s): Robert Lee and Lulabelle Freeman

Precious Jewel Freeman Graham (May 3, 1925 – November 30, 2015) was an educator, social worker, and attorney. She was professor emeritus of social work and legal studies at Antioch College, Yellow Springs, Ohio. She was the second black woman to serve as president of the World YWCA. She was named to the Ohio Women's Hall of Fame in 2008.

== Early life and education ==
Precious Jewel Freeman was born on May 3, 1925, in Springfield, Ohio, to Robert Lee and Lulabelle Freeman. She grew up in a racially segregated city.

She attended Fisk University on a scholarship, earning a bachelor's degree in sociology and psychology in 1946. She pursued graduate studies in sociology at Howard University from 1946 to 1948, and in 1953 earned her master's degree in social service administration from Case Western Reserve University.

== YWCA ==
Graham began her association with the YWCA as a teenager in 1939, joining the colored division of the YWCA Girl Reserves in Springfield. After earning her undergraduate degree, she served as associate director of the YWCA teen program department in Grand Rapids, Michigan, from 1947 to 1950. From 1953 to 1956, she was the metropolitan teenage program coordinator in Detroit.

She was a member of the board of directors of the YWCA USA from 1970 to 1989. She served as vice-president from 1973 to 1979 and was elected president of the YWCA USA in 1979, the second black woman to fill that post. She served as national president for two three-year terms.

Graham joined the executive committee of the World YWCA in 1975. She was elected president of the World YWCA in 1987, being the second black woman in that post, and served a five-year term until 1991.

== Academic career ==
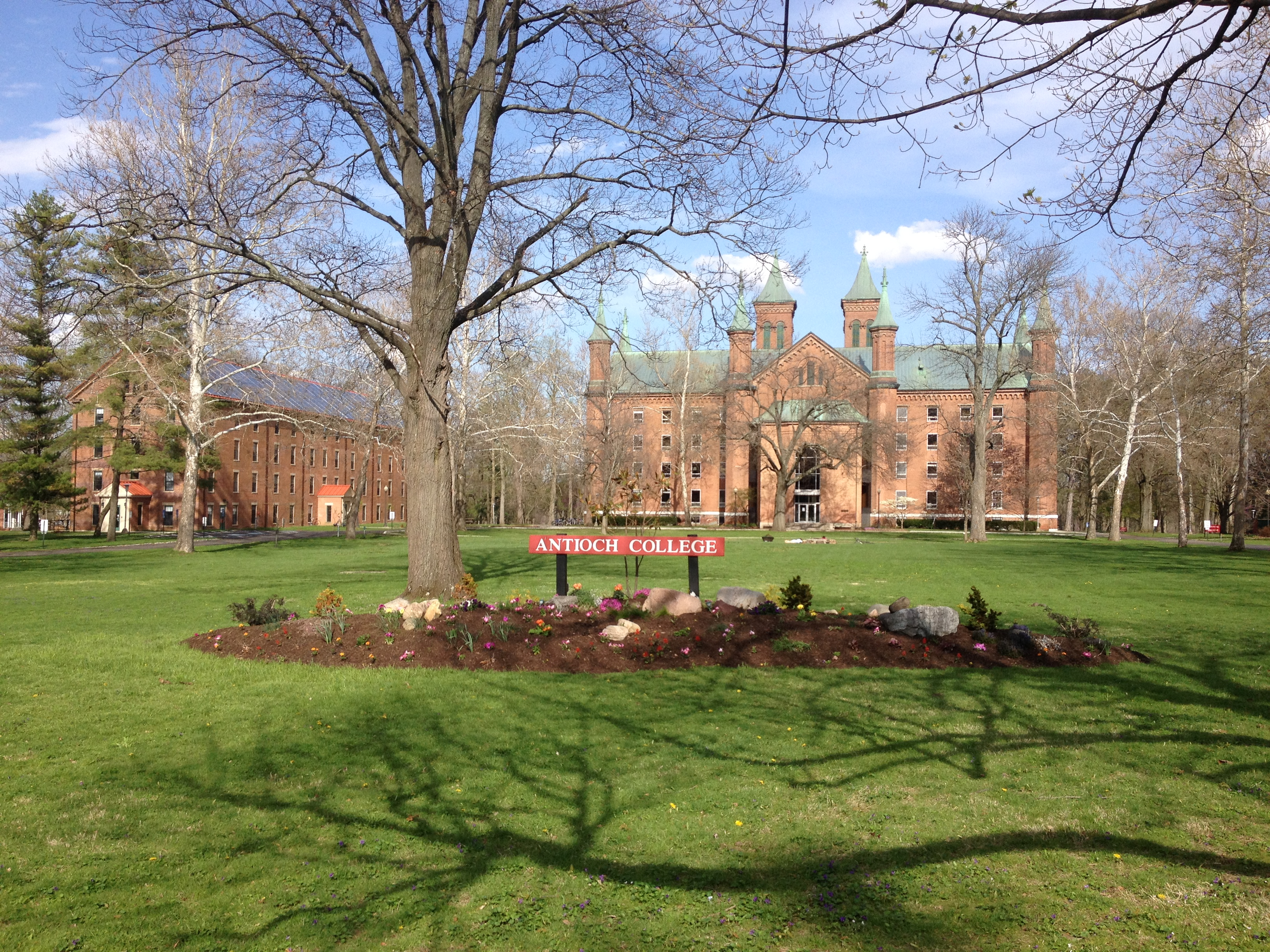
Antioch College

Graham joined the administrative faculty at Antioch College in 1964 and directed the Program for Interracial Education from 1965 to 1969. She later became a social work faculty advisor and, in 1969, obtained a grant from the United States Department of Health, Education and Welfare to inaugurate the social work undergraduate program at the college. She served as assistant professor of social welfare and then full professor from 1969 to 1986, when she retired.

Seeing the need to add understanding of the legal system to social work studies, Graham returned to university in the 1970s and earned a Juris Doctor at the University of Dayton at the age of 50. After passing the Ohio bar, she helped develop a curriculum at Antioch that combined social work and legal studies.

== Memberships ==
Graham was a charter member of the National Association of Social Workers and a life member of the National Council of Negro Women. She was a member of the board of directors of Antioch College from 1994 to 1996.

== Honors and recognition ==
Graham was inducted into the Ohio Women's Hall of Fame in 1988. She was also named to the Greene County Women's Hall of Fame in 1982. In 1987, she was named one of the Ten Top Women by the Dayton Daily News. In 1985, the Ohio House of Representatives passed a resolution to honor her for her leadership in the YWCA. The Miami Valley Chapter of the National Association of Social Workers named her Social Worker of the Year in 1975.

She has been listed in numerous Who's Who directories, including The Who's Who of Women, Who's Who in America, Who's Who in Politics, Outstanding Educators of America, Who's Who Among Black Americans (1981 and 1985), Who's Who in Religion, Who's Who of American Women, and Who's Who Among African Americans (1997, 2000, 2008).

In 1991, she was awarded an honorary doctorate in humane letters by the Meadville Lombard Theological School.

== Personal ==
She married Paul Nathaniel Graham, a rubber chemist, in 1953. They had two sons. In 1956, they moved to Yellow Springs, Ohio, where Paul Graham was employed at Vernay Laboratories. In 1962, Paul Graham was involved in a racial segregation issue with a local barber who refused to cut his hair and who was subsequently served with a cease and desist order.

In 2002, she suffered a heart attack, from which she recovered. She wrote a memoir, The Life of My Times, 1925–2000. She died at her home on November 30, 2015.
