= Grace Berlin =

American ecologist, ornithologist and historian

- Born: Grace Cowling; March 3, 1897
- Died: August 29, 1982 (aged 85)
- Occupations: Ecologist, Ornithologist, Historian
- Spouse: Herbert Berlin
- Honours: Ohio Women's Hall of Fame

Grace Fern Berlin (March 3, 1897 – August 29, 1982) was an American ecologist, ornithologist and historian. She was one of the first women in Ohio to receive a degree in ecology.

The daughter of Sanford Matthew Cowling and Ruth Richardson, she was born Grace Fern Cowling in Monclova, Ohio. She studied animal ecology at Oberlin College, graduating in 1923. She then returned to farming. Two years later, she married Herbert Berlin. Berlin held offices in the National Audubon Society, the Toledo Naturalists Association, the Ohio Audubon Society, the National Wildlife Association and the historical societies of Ohio, Whitehouse, Maumee Valley and Waterville. She also published several papers on early Ohio architecture. Berlin was inducted into the Ohio Women's Hall of Fame in 1980.

She died at St. Luke's Hospital at the age of 85.

== Education and career ==
Grace Berlin had always been interested in farming. As she grew older, she changed her plan and decided she wanted to study and work in ecology and ornithology. She attended Oberlin College and was one of the first women to receive a degree in ecology there. She graduated in 1923. She published many papers and the content was often about coursework in college including ecology field trips to the western United States. She was a scientists and fell under multiple titles. Berlin was an ecologist, ornithologist, naturalist, and historian. In 1980 she was inducted into the Ohio women's hall of fame.

== Personal life ==
Grace Berlin was born Grace Cowling on March 3, 1897, in Monclova, Lucas County, Ohio. She was married to Herbert Berlin, who died in 1975. She had no children. She lived for 85 years and eventually died in 1982 at St. Luke's Hospital in Maumee, Ohio.

She spent much of her life focused on her career but apart from her career, Berlin was interested in the antique market. She became a guide at the Log House in Whitehouse, a village in the Toledo Metropolitan Area in Ohio. She was also a part of many different groups that were focused on nature and history. She was heavily involved in these groups that were in or near her town. She held a position in almost all of them at on point or another.

== Achievements ==
Grace Berlin was involved in many different groups and held many different positions. She was mostly interested in nature and historical groups. Below is a list of Berlin's different positions and achievements:

- Inducted into Ohio Women's Hall of Fame
- President of Monclova Women's Republican Club
- Office holder in the National Audubon Society
- Office holder in Toledo Naturalists Association
- Office holder in the Naturalists Camera Club
- Office holder in the Ohio Audubon Society
- Office holder in the National Wildlife Association
- Office holder in the Ohio Historical Society
- Office holder in the Muamee Valley Historical Society
- Office holder in the Waterville Historical Society
- Office holder in the Whitehouse Historical Society
