= Bunny Cowan Clark =

American physicist

- Born: September 8, 1935; El Paso, Texas
- Died: October 2015 (aged 80)
- Education: Wayne State University (Ph.D. 1973); Kansas State University (M.S. 1963); Kansas State University (B.S. 1958)
- Awards: Distinguished university professor, Ohio State University; Fellow, American Physical Society; Fellow, American Association for Advancement of Science; Fowler Award for Excellence in Nuclear Physics, Ohio Section of the American Physical Society; Howard Maxwell Award for Distinguished Service, Eastern Great Lakes Section of the American Physical Society; Inductee, Ohio Women's Hall of Fame
- Scientific career
- Fields: Theoretical physics
- Workplaces: Ohio State University
- Thesis: Optical model partial wave analysis of intermediate energy (0.6 - 1.0 GeV) proton-nucleus elastic scattering (1973)

Bunny Cowan Clark (September 8, 1935 – October 2015) was an American nuclear physicist and a professor of physics at Ohio State University. She attended Kansas State University for both her bachelor's and master's degrees. She earned her doctorate in physics from Wayne State University in 1973.

== Personal life and education ==
Clark was born on September 8, 1935, in El Paso, Texas. From a young age she was encouraged by her parents to seek a career in the field of science despite it being a predominantly male field. She began her career in the science field by working at General Motors where she gained critical knowledge on computer technologies that later proved to be essential to her career. She went on to gain her master's degree in condensed matter at Kansas State University in 1958, followed by her M.S. degree in 1963 with a thesis about Frequency spectrum of elastic waves in body centered cubic lattices with Basil Curnutte and Robert Herman supervising her research. At Wayne State University she went on to complete her Ph.D. whilst working closely with physicist at the University of Illinois.

== Career ==
Clark's first professional break came about working with computer technology at General Motors where she worked for nine years. Clark later was offered a faculty position in the Physics faculty at Ohio State University in 1981, where she become a professor in 1986. Her research was within nuclear theoretical physics. At the 2001 Commencement Address for Ohio State, she spoke candidly about her experience as a woman in physics.

I ignored, I don't know how many comments like: 'Bunny, why don't you go into library science?' 'Bunny you should learn to type.' Physics was not supposed to be a women's work.

Clark was a fierce advocate for women in physics. She helped create the American Physical Society Committee on Status of Women in Physics. Clark quit accepting graduate students after an incident in 1994, in which a female graduate student was dismissed despite receiving higher scores than some of the male students that were retained.

Clark was well known for her generosity. She worked tirelessly to help young faculty members and graduate students secure funding.

If our students needed a refrigerator in their room, she bought them a refrigerator ... She used her money to support people in whatever way seemed necessary if it wasn't something you could get from the grant or department.

— Robert Perry, professor of physics at Ohio State University

== Publications ==
Clarke was the author or co-author of over 60 scientific publications. These included:

- E. D. Cooper, S. Hama, and B. C. Clark (2009) Global Dirac optical potential from helium to lead. Physical Review C 80 034605
- L. Kurth Kerr, B. C. Clark, S. Hama, L. Ray, G. W. Hoffmann (2000) Theoretical and Experimental K+ + Nucleus Total and Reaction Cross Sections from the KDP-RIA Model. Progress of Theoretical Physics 103 (2) 321–335
- E. D. Cooper, S. Hama, B. C. Clark, and R. L. Mercer (1993) Global Dirac phenomenology for proton-nucleus elastic scattering Physical Review C 47 297
- E. D. Cooper, B. C. Clark, R. Kozack, S. Shim, S. Hama, J. I. Johansson, H. S. Sherif, R. L. Mercer, and B. D. Serot (1987) Global optical potentials for elastic p +^{40} Ca scattering using the Dirac equation. Physical Review C 36 2170(R)
- J. B. Bellicard, P. Bounin, R. F. Frosch, R. Hofstadter, J. S. McCarthy, F. J. Uhrhane, M. R. Yearian, B. C. Clark, R. Herman, and D. G. Ravenhall (1967) Scattering of 750-MeV Electrons by Calcium Isotopes. Phys. Rev. Lett 19 527

She also published about women in physics, including:

- Mildred S Dresselhaus, Judy R Franz and Bunny C Clark (1994) Interventions to increase the participation of women in physics Science 263 (5152) 1392 - 1393

== Recognition and legacy ==
Clark was named a Fellow of the American Physical Society (APS), after a nomination from the APS Division of Nuclear Physics, "for contributions to relativistic treatment of nucleon scattering from nuclei".

Clark and her husband Tom created the Bunny and Thomas Clark Scholarship Endowment Fund at the Ohio State University Physics Department. The endowment awards scholarships to both undergraduate and graduate students, with an emphasis on underrepresented groups such as women and minorities. After the deaths of her and her husband, her colleague and friend Robert Mercer and the Mercer Family Foundation established the Bunny C. Clark Student Support Fund.
