= Kasturi Rajadhyaksha =

Indian physician and community worker

- Born: 1923 or 1924; India
- Died: February 7, 2010 (aged 86); Ohio
- Other names: Dr. Raja
- Occupations: Physician, community worker

Kasturi Rajadhyaksha (1923/1924 – 7 February 2010), often referred to as Dr. Raja, was an Indian physician and community worker. She helped several support groups specifically for Indian or South Asian people, and focused particularly on ending domestic violence and helping South Asian business people.

== Personal life ==
Kasturi Rajadhyaksha was born in 1923 or 1924 in India. In 1945, Rajadhyaksha earned her MBBS degree after studying gynaecology in Mumbai. She also held a Master's degree in Public Health, which she earned from Johns Hopkins University. Rajadhyaksha was married to Vithal Kashinath Rajadhyaksha, with whom she had two sons.

== Career ==
Kasturi Rajadhyaksha worked as a physician, and after seeing the difficulties faced by the pregnant women she treated, began her career in community service setting up organizations for women. In 1965, Rajadhyaksha moved to the United States, where she continued her community work to help women. After finishing her master's degree in Public Health, she became the Asian coordinator for the Jhpiego, a non-profit organization run by Johns Hopkins University to improve international education in gynecology and obstetrics. She spent six years in this position, during which time she traveled to over twenty countries to organize trainings in laprascopy. She went on to work as a director and as the Minority Business Coordinator for the DLZ Corporation, an architectural and engineering firm based in Columbus, Ohio.

In 1990, Rajadhyaksha founded the Women of Indian Subcontinent Support Group (WISSUG), a group to help women workers. She co-founded the Asian American Commerce Group (AACG), a group for Asian-American business owners in central Ohio. In 2003, Rajadhyaksha and nine others founded ASHA-Ray of Hope, a non-profit working to help domestic abuse victims in the South Asian community. She also was among the founders of the Women to Women Business Mentoring Group. She served on the Columbus Equal Opportunity Commission, and as a board member of the South Central Minority Business Development Council.

In September 2008, Rajadhyaksha was inducted into the Ohio Women's Hall of Fame. Throughout her career, she received several awards for her work. In 1996 she won the YWCA Woman of Achievement Award, and in 1998 she was awarded the Ohio's Federation of Indian Association's Outstanding Community Service Award. She was given the Ohio Civil Rights Commission's Outstanding Leader Award, and in 2001 she also won the Women of Courage Award. In 2003, she won the Most Distinguished Physician Community Service Award from the National Association of American Physicians of Indian Origin.
