= Louisa Fast =

American suffragist and activist

Louisa K. Fast (January 15, 1878 – November 6, 1979) was an American suffragist and international activist.

== Early life ==
Louisa was born in Canton, Ohio to Melanchton Luther Fast and Maria Louisa Kuhn. Louisa's father died one month before she was born, and her mother died three weeks after she was born. When her parents died, she became a ward of William McKinley, who was a friend of her parents. He was governor of Ohio at the time. Kinley took care of her until Louisa became of age, and kept in contact with her even during his presidency. Fast graduated in 1898 from Smith College. She went to France during World War I as part of Smith College's relief unit, and she worked to rebuild the countryside.

== Activism ==
Fast became involved with the League of Women Voters in 1920. At the time, the organization had just been formed. Through the organization, she traveled around Ohio advocating for women's groups to organize and form local chapters of the League of Women Voters. In 1923, she got a job working with the International Relations Branch of the League of Women Voters and worked with Carrie Chapman Catt to develop conferences. In 1935, she helped plan the 1935 Istanbul-based conference of the International Alliance of Women for Suffrage and Equal Citizenship.

== Legacy ==
Fast was inducted into the Ohio Women's Hall of Fame in 1980, in the category of Women's Suffrage and Cultural Activism. She also has a park named after her in Tiffin, Ohio.
