= Fay Biles =

American academic and college sports coach (1927–2020)

Professor Emerita Fay Biles
- Born: Fay Reifsnyder; March 31, 1927; Reading, Pennsylvania, U.S.
- Died: October 28, 2020 (aged 93); Asheville, North Carolina, U.S.
- Known for: First woman vice president of an Ohio university
- Spouse: Bedford Biles

Academic background
- Education: Duke University; M.A., Kent State University; PhD, Ohio State University

Fay Biles (née Reifsnyder; March 31, 1927 – October 28, 2020) was an American academic and college sports coach. She was the first woman to serve in a vice presidency role at an Ohio university. As a head coach of the field hockey and lacrosse teams, she logged more victories than any other coach in Kent State University history. She was inducted into the Ohio Women's Hall of Fame in 1986.

== Personal life ==
Biles was born Fay Reifsnyder in Reading, Pennsylvania as the youngest of three girls. Her father, a former tennis player, ran a family business as a hosiery manufacturer. Growing up Biles was active in sports, playing both field hockey and lacrosse throughout her schooling years. Although she was inclined to attend Ursinus College as a pre-med student, her older sisters encouraged her to attend Duke University. She was one of two people selected from Philadelphia to attend Duke University. Biles is a member of Delta Delta Delta. While she was at Duke she met Bedford Biles, a World War II paratrooper who participated in D-Day and the Battle of the Bulge. The two married shortly after Biles graduated.

Biles died in Asheville, North Carolina on October 28, 2020, at the age of 93.

== Career ==
After working as a high school teacher for four years, Biles began to study for her master's degree at Kent State University while simultaneously teaching and coaching at the University of Akron. She later earned her PhD in communications at Ohio State University. After earning her PhD, Biles taught health and physical education at Kent State.

Besides teaching, Biles worked as a head coach for Kent State's field hockey and lacrosse teams from 1959 to 1972. She coached the 1963 field hockey team to a winning record with an undefeated season. She was the most successful coach in Kent State history. In 1966, Biles became the president-elect of the Physical Education Department for the Ohio College Association. In 1967, Biles and her husband bought a vacation home on Marco Island, Florida.

After a survey conducted by the Physical Education Department revealed a lack of knowledge among the student body about the objectives of physical education programs, Biles began to construct the Physical Education Public Information (PEPI) program. In 1971, Biles took a year off from Kent State to help found PEPI. She returned to Kent State and presented her findings at an American Alliance's Convention. After her presentation, Biles received an offer from the new president of Kent State University, Glenn Olds, to become the Vice President for Public Affairs and Development. She was the first female vice president at Kent State University and in all of Ohio. While working as Vice President for Public Affairs and Development, Biles dealt with the repercussions of the Kent State shootings. As the spokesperson for the University, Biles detailed she received constant harassment, such as death threats, from students.

== Other activities ==
In 1974, she ran as a Republican nominee for the 62nd District seat in the Ohio General Assembly. In 1975, she formed the Marco Island Taxpayers Association and remained its president until 2000. She also served on the Emergency Medical Services Advisory Council and the Water and Wastewater Authority of Collier County.

As chair of PEPI, Biles joined forces with Jean Barkow to help begin a national fund raising "rope-a-thon". In 1978, Jump Rope for Heart was launched. Jump Rope for Heart named an individual award in her honor, the Faye Biles Educational Award. Due to her interest and activism in physical education, Biles was selected to serve on a United States Olympic Committee. In 1986, Biles was inducted into the Ohio Women's Hall of Fame and awarded the R. Tait McKenzie Award by SHAPE America. After her husband's retirement in 1989, they moved to Marco Island full-time. She was later awarded the Luther Halsey Gulick Award in 1998 while serving as a member of the American Association of University Women (AAUW). Two years later, Biles was elected president of Marco Island's AAUW branch from 2000 to 2002.

Biles later served on the board of directors for Bancorp Trust Co., FirstMerit Bank of Clearwater and the Vision Planning Committees on Marco Island. In 2001, Biles was elected to the Florida Gulf Coast University Foundation Inc.

In 2010, Biles was awarded the Centennial Alumni Award by the College of Education, Health and Human Service. She was also named a Founding Fellow of Florida Gulf Coast University Foundation. After her husband died in 2013, Biles left Marco Island and moved to live with her nephews. In 2016, the City of Marco Island announced they were dedicating a community room in her and her husband's honour.

== Selected bibliography ==
The following is a list of publications:

- Television: production and utilization in physical education (1971)
- Sport skills: a conceptual approach to meaningful movement (1975)
- GWS: links to leadership: promoting women in sport: proceedings (1992)
- Play for power: creating leaders through sport (1996)
