= Margaret A. Mahoney =

American politician

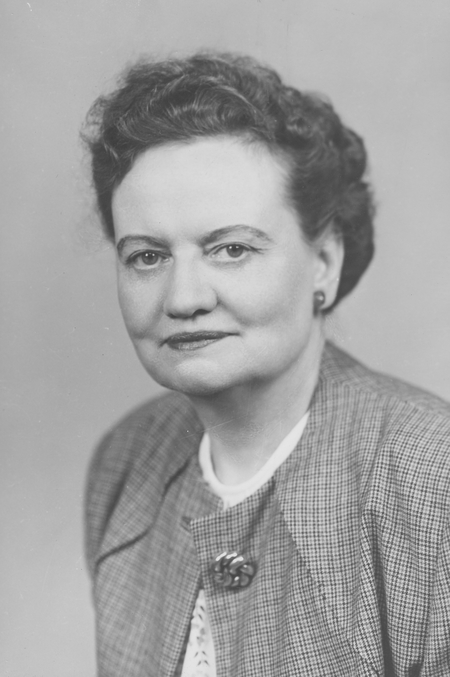

Member of the Ohio Senate
- In office 1943–1951

Member of the Ohio House of Representatives
- In office 1938–1942

Personal details
- Born: July 12, 1893
- Died: March 27, 1981 (aged 87)
- Party: Democratic

Margaret A. Mahoney (July 12, 1893 – March 27, 1981) was an American Democratic politician from Ohio. She held a number of political positions and served in the state's House and Senate and was the first Democratic woman elected to the Ohio Senate and the first woman majority leader of the chamber. Mahoney was inducted into the Ohio Women's Hall of Fame in 1978.

== Biography ==
Born in Cleveland, Ohio, Mahoney attended evening classes at Cleveland's West High School of Commerce to graduate from high school. She graduated from John Marshall School of Law after working as a salesperson and a secretary. Mahoney was the legislative chair for a number of women's organizations, which led her to become interested in running for the state legislature. She was first elected to political office in 1938 as a member of the Ohio House of Representatives. Mahoney served in both chambers of the Ohio state legislature, and became the first Democratic woman elected to the Ohio Senate in 1942. She was from 1949 to 1950 the Senate President Pro Tem and Majority Leader, and was the first woman to hold that role. She also served on a number of committees including the Senate Rules Committee.

In March 1951, Mahoney was appointed Chief of the State Securities Division upon leaving the Senate. She held numerous political offices, often being the first woman to hold the position, including Director of the Department of Industrial Relations of Ohio from 1953 to 1957; and was a member of the Cleveland Civil Service Commission and the Director of the Department of Industrial Relations. She was a Presidential Elector and Delegate to the Democratic National Convention multiple times, and was the only woman on the Ohio State Council of Defense during World War II.

As of 2019, Mahoney is still the only woman to hold the top leadership position in the Ohio Senate.
