= Esther Greisheimer =

American medical researcher

Esther M. Greisheimer (October 31, 1891 – 1982) was an American academic and medical researcher.

== Early life ==
Greishimer was born in Chillicothe, Ohio. Greisheimer received a BA in education from Ohio University in 1914, an MA in general physiology from Clark University in 1916, a PhD in human physiology and biochemistry from the University of Chicago in 1919 and an MD from the University of Minnesota in 1923.

== Career ==
She became a licensed medical practitioner and surgeon in 1924. She pursued an academic career for the next fifty years at the University of Minnesota, the Medical College of Pennsylvania, and the Temple University School of Medicine. She published over 150 articles in various journals but is perhaps best known for her textbook Physiology and Anatomy.

She was a member of the Sigma Xi and Alpha Omega Alpha honor societies. In 1940, she received the Ohio University Medal of Merit for her contributions to medical education. Greisheimer was named to the Ohio Women's Hall of Fame in 1980.
