= Norma Marcere =

African-American educator

- Born: October 21, 1908; Canton, Ohio, U.S.
- Died: August 10, 2004 (aged 95); Louisville, Ohio
- Education: Kent State University
- Occupations: Activist, feminist, educator
- Spouse: Percy Marcere (m. 1929–1971)
- Children: 2
- Honors: Ohio Women's Hall of Fame (1985)

Norma Snipes Marcere (October 21, 1908 – August 10, 2004) was an American educator. After being rejected from employment opportunities due to her race, Marcere became the first African-American counselor and school psychologist in the Akron City Schools.

== Early life and career ==
Marcere was born on October 21, 1908, in Canton, Ohio. She graduated from Canton McKinley High School in 1926. After graduating from McKinley, Marcere worked to pay for her teaching degree tuition at Kent State University. After earning her teaching degree, Marcere graduated with a Bachelor of Science degree in elementary education and a Master of Arts degree in counseling. With these degrees, Marcere applied to teach in her hometown of Canton, however, a superintendent refused to hire her based on her race. As a result, her first teaching placement was at Edmund A. Junior High. As her career developed, she became the first African-American counselor and school psychologist in the Akron City Schools.

In 1969, Marcere was elected a lay member of the Youngstown Diocesan Board of Education. Nearly a decade later, in 1976, Marcere retired from teaching and wrote two autobiographies. The two books were later formed into a play by Lois DiGiacomo in 1994 which was performed in front of an audience of more than 12,000 people.

In 1973, Marcere was named Junior League Woman of the Year. In 1979, Marcere established the Project for Academic Excellence (PAX), a Saturday school for underachieving inner-city elementary students. This led to the development of Study, Think, Read, Investigate, Volunteer and Excel (STRIVE), a program for minority students that focused on social issues and personal responsibility.

In 1991, Marcere was awarded the Norma Award, named after Norma Sigler Atkins Rowlands, for her educational work. In 1998, she earned the Sister Thea Bowman Medallion from the Office for Black Catholic Ministries of the Diocese of Toledo. She was inducted into the Ohio Women's Hall of Fame in 1985.

Marcere died on August 10, 2004, of natural causes.
