= Aurora Gonzalez =

Mexican-American community activist (1924–1991)

Gonzalez in 1984

Aurora L. Gonzalez (1924 – October 8, 1991) was an organizer, educator and activist in the Hispanic community of Toledo, Ohio, United States.

== Activism ==
As president of the Guadalupe Center board of directors in the late 1970s, she pressured the city of Toledo to spend federal funds to build the Centro Unico community building, later renamed the "Aurora Gonzalez Community & Family Resource Center" in her honor. She was the founder and leader of La Voz del Barrio, a community citizens action organization which she founded in 1980.

== Honors ==
In 1985, she became the first Hispanic woman elected to the Ohio Women's Hall of Fame.

== Death ==
She died in a car crash on October 8, 1991.

== Legacy ==
- Aurora Gonzalez Drive in Toledo
- Aurora Gonzalez Community & Family Resource Center, 1301 Broadway, Toledo, Ohio
