= Eusebia Hunkins =

American composer and musicologist

Eusebia Simpson Hunkins (June 20, 1902 – September 9, 1980) was an American composer and expert on Appalachian music. She became known for her operas and compositions, especially the Smoky Mountain Opera, which include folk stories and music from the Appalachian region of the United States. She was inducted into the Ohio Women's Hall of Fame in 1981.

== Biography ==
Hunkins was born in Troy, Ohio. She began learning piano and music theory in Dayton, Ohio, and later received a fellowship to the Juilliard School. She eventually worked as a representative of the Juilliard Foundation at Cornell College and later studied composition at the Aspen Music Festival and in Salzburg. She met her husband, Maurel Hunkins through their work at the Chautauqua Symphony, where she was as a piano soloist. They were married in 1931 and for several years, she worked in New York City where she wrote music, taught and conducted choruses.

Hunkins was an authority on Appalachian music. She began her research into the music of the Appalachians in 1946, shortly after she moved to Athens, Ohio. Her husband became the dean of men at Ohio University (OU) that year.

The Smoky Mountain Opera was performed in 1952 at OU. The Smoky Mountain Opera includes folk music and traditional songs from the Appalachian Mountain region. The opera was performed by college and high school students around the country. The Journal of American Folklore called the opera, "simple, unpretentious 'informal folk opera.'" The opera follows a trend of American composers using traditional folk music and stories. The Smoky Mountain Opera has been performed more than 4,000 times.

Wondrous Love is a Christmas drama which includes traditional carols sung in the Appalachian region. The world premiere of her opera, Young Lincoln, took place on television in August 1959.

Hunkins also composed children's operas, compositions for various instruments, liturgical dramas and ballets. She was active in the National Federation of Music Clubs.

Hunkins was inducted in the Ohio Women's Hall of Fame posthumously in 1981.
