= Grace Goulder Izant =

American journalist

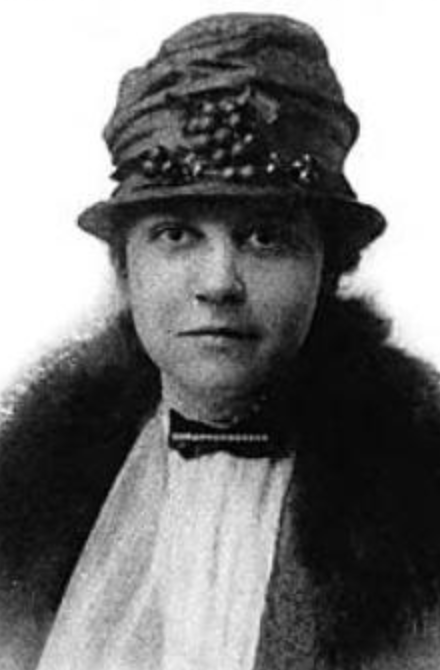
- Grace Goulder, from a 1918 publication
- Born: Grace Goulder; March 27, 1893; Cleveland, Ohio, United States
- Died: November 17, 1984 (aged 91); Akron, Ohio, United States
- Occupations: Writer, journalist
- Years active: 1919-1984
- Known for: Ohio history, biography of John D. Rockefeller

Grace Goulder Izant (1893–1984) was an Ohio writer and historian who wrote for the Plain Dealer Magazine and published several books on Ohio history. She was the first Ohioan ever honored by the American Association for State and Local History, which recognized her work in 1962. She won the Cleveland Arts Prize for Literature in 1965 and was inducted into the Ohio Women's Hall of Fame in 1982.

== Biography ==
Grace Goulder was born on March 27, 1893, in Cleveland, Ohio, to Marian (née Clements) and Charles Goulder. After graduating from Vassar College in 1914, she began working as a society reporter for The Plain Dealer in Cleveland. When World War I broke out, Goulder became the head of national publicity for the YWCA, traveling through France, Germany and England helping relocating war brides with information about their new homes in the United States. After her 1919 return to the US, Goulder married Robert Izant, who would become vice president of Central National Bank in Cleveland. In 1924 the couple moved to Hudson and began their family.

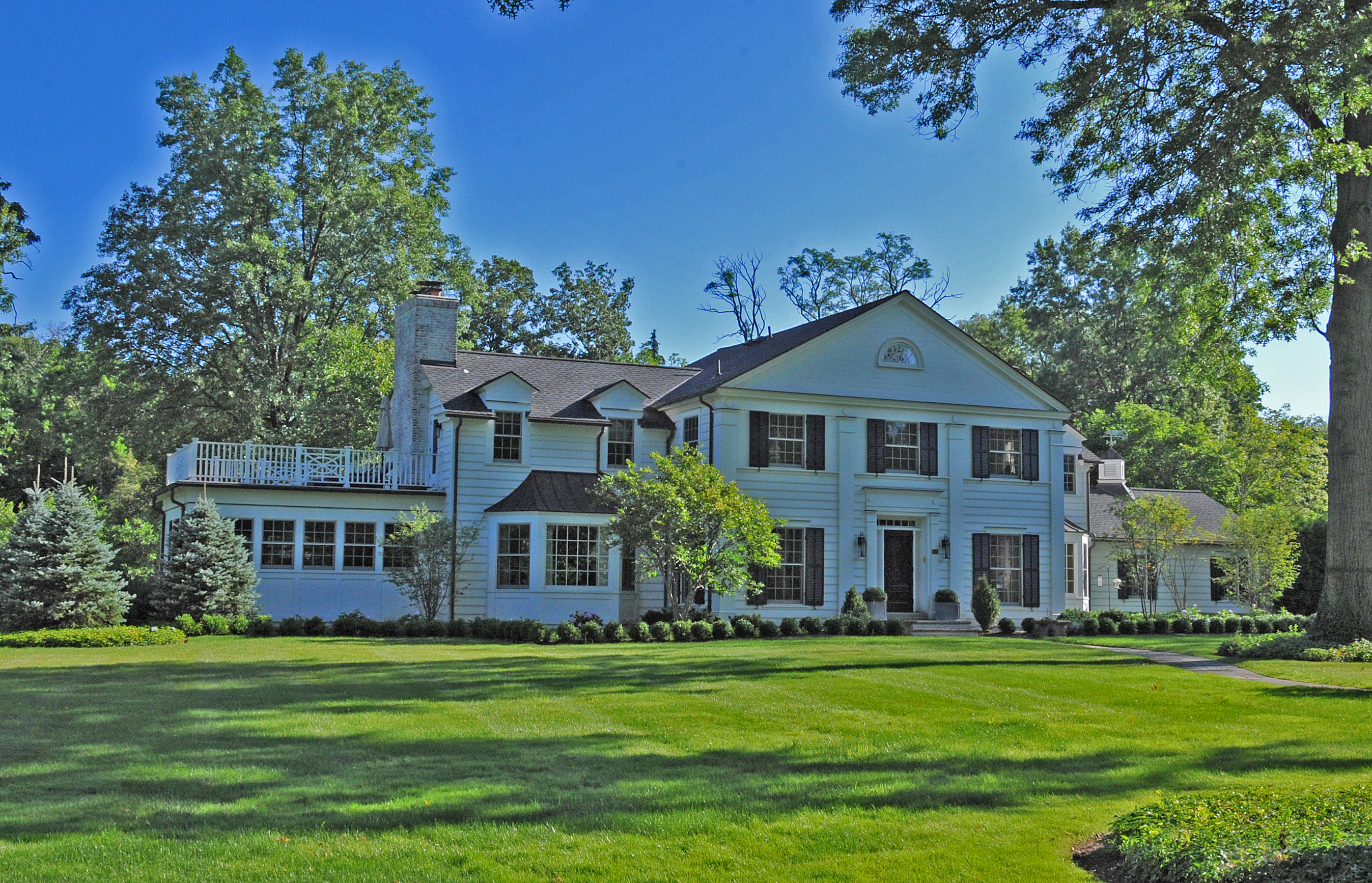
Grace Goulder Izant Home, Hudson, Summit County, Ohio, National Register of Historic Places

In 1937, for the centennial of Hudson's village incorporation Goulder-Izant wrote an article which was purchased by the Plain Dealer, and resumed her career. The article was the first of what would become a regular weekly Sunday column "Ohio Scenes and Citizens", which featuring themes on Ohio history, people and places. The column ran in the Sunday Magazine until 1969. She and her husband traveled the backwoods of Ohio collecting materials for the stories, which she often photographed. Her articles won many awards and honors, including recognition in 1949 from the Ohio State Archeological and Historical Society and the Ohio Sesquicentennial Committee in 1953. That same year, she published her first book This Is Ohio, which contained brief sketches of each of the 88 counties in the state, its famous residents, and its folklore.

In 1962, Goulder-Izant became the first Ohioan ever recognized by the American Association for State and Local History. Two years later she published her second book, Ohio Scenes and Citizens, which collected some of her best magazine pieces. It featured biographical sketches of famous Ohioans or people who had Ohio ties and included Paul Laurence Dunbar, Thomas Edison, Marshall Field, James Garfield, Ulysses S. Grant, Warren G. Harding, Philip Sheridan and Woodrow Wilson, among others. The work was recognized and well received, winning Goulder-Izant the 1965 Cleveland Arts Prize. After retiring from publishing weekly columns at the age of 76, Goulder-Izant spent her time researching the Rockefeller Family Archives at the Western Reserve Historical Society and in 1972, published a well-received biography of John D. Rockefeller. The book, John D. Rockefeller, The Cleveland Years chronicled the early life of the oil magnate telling for the first time how he created the enterprise that would be known as Standard Oil.

Goulder-Izant died on November 17, 1984, in Akron, Ohio. Shortly after her death, Kent State University Press published her final work, Hudson's Heritage: A Chronicle of the Founding and the Flowering of the Village of Hudson, Ohio, which used biographical sketches to relay the history of the village where Goulder-Izant had lived for 60 years.

== Legacy ==
In her quest to write the stories behind the history of Ohio, Goulder-Izant collected and preserved many documents important to the history of the state. Besides collecting documents on buildings and monuments, she collected the papers of David Hudson and John Brown. She served as a trustee of the Western Reserve Historical Society, receiving the Ohio Governor's Award for her preservation work. She was inducted into the Ohio Women's Hall of Fame in 1982.
