= Amelia Nava =

Head of Auxilio y Amistad community service organization

Amelia Nava is the founder and president of Auxilio y Amistad (Aid and Friendship), based in Tiffin, Ohio. Nava was inducted into the Ohio Women's Hall of Fame in 1986 for her work providing community services to Mexican-American migrant farm workers.

In 2012, the Farmworker Agencies Liaison Communication and Outreach Network (FALCON) recognized Nava with their Advocate for Community Service award.
