= Georgia Griffith (educator) =

American deafblind educator

- Born: November 12, 1931
- Died: September 14, 2005 (aged 73)
- Alma mater: Ohio State School for the Blind; Capital University

Georgia Marie Griffith (November 12, 1931 – September 14, 2005) was an American deafblind educator, author, and online community pioneer. Griffith began her career as a music educator. When her hearing deteriorated as an adult, she worked for the Library of Congress translating music into braille. At age 50 Griffith became an early adopter of the Internet, managing message forums for CompuServe and providing assistance to people with disabilities in using computers.

== Early life and education ==
Georgia Marie Griffith was born in Lancaster, Ohio on November 12, 1931. Her parents discovered she was blind shortly after birth. She attended the Ohio State School for the Blind, graduating in 1950.

Griffith was the first blind person to attend Capital University. She graduated in 1954 with a bachelor's degree in music education.

== Career and service to people with disabilities ==
After graduating from college, Griffith taught music, including directing choirs and teaching piano lessons to children. Her career as a music instructor was curtailed when her hearing deteriorated; she lost her hearing at age 38.

In 1971, she began working for the National Library Service for the Blind and Print Disabled, where she was the only proofreader of Braille music. She taught herself twelve foreign languages to translate vocal music into braille. Griffith was considered the preeminent authority in the U.S. on braille music, becoming the only class A-certified braille music proofreader in the country. Funding for her proofreading position was cut in 1981.

In the early 1980s, Griffith's friends pooled their money to buy her a VersaBraille, equipping her personal computer with a refreshable braille display. This allowed her to communicate with people around the world. Griffith later used a Telesensory Power Braille 40 terminal to provide braille access. She accessed programs via Microsoft Windows operating systems by using the JAWS screen reader.

Griffith began working for CompuServe as a database manager/information specialist in 1982, managing multiple message forums. She ran forums on political debate and religion, as well as one forum dedicated to the White House. In a 1995 New York Times article, Griffith was described as being "known in the on-line community as a 'Net Queen,' writing faster than most people talk, with a distinctive voice that is at turns witty, forceful and self-deprecating." She was a systems operator for the National Information Providers Special Interest Group (NIPSIG) on CompuServe and developed a database of services for people with disabilities, providing support to those learning to use computers for the first time.

She also served on the board of directors of the National Braille Association. Griffith died September 14, 2005.

== Honors and legacy ==
In 1987, the mayor of Lancaster declared January 11 "Georgia Griffith Day." Griffith was inducted into the Ohio Women's Hall of Fame in 1994. She received the Great Communicator Award from the Central Ohio Speech and Hearing Center in 1996. Griffith received an award from the Smithsonian Institution in 1997 for her work with the CompuServe Handicapped Users' Database, a compendium of information for and about disabled people.

She published an autobiography, Running Around in Family Circles With Friends in Pursuit, in 2003.
