= Alvina Costilla =

American social worker and activist

- Born: Alvina Teniente; 1926 or 1927; San Antonio, Texas
- Occupations: Activist, social worker

Alvina Teniente de Costilla (born 1926 or 1927) is a Mexican-American social worker and activist in the Chicano and farmworkers movements.

== Early life and education ==
Alvina Teniente was born in San Antonio, Texas into a Mexican-American family of migrant farmworkers. She attended college in San Antonio before settling in Toledo, Ohio in 1948. Her husband, also born in Texas, was a migrant worker.

== Career ==
Costilla worked for the employment services office in Toledo for thirty-three years, beginning as a bilingual interviewer and retiring as a regional supervisor. Through her work, and as a volunteer for Catholic Charities Migrant Ministries, she helped migrant farmworkers find employment and access social services. Costilla also served as co-president of Toledoans United for Social Action, a non-profit that works with local churches to organize community actions related to anti-violence and substance abuse prevention. Her advocacy work also includes volunteering for the Lucas County Democratic Party and organizing fundraisers for scholarships at Latino community festivals.

Costilla is a leader in the toledano community, people of Mexican descent living in Toledo, Ohio. She coauthored a study about differing views of assimilation and Mexican identity among toledanos.

== Awards and legacy ==
Costilla received the Distinguished Hispanic Ohioan Award and the Access to Justice Community Advocacy Award. She was inducted into the Ohio Women's Hall of Fame in September 1999, coinciding with Hispanic Heritage Month. She was nominated for inclusion in the book Profiles of Ohio Women, 1803-2003, a biographical dictionary compiled for Ohio's bicentennial in 2003. In 2013, Costilla received an Eagle Award at the MidWest LatinoFest for her contributions to the Latino community.
