= Ivy Gunter =

American amputee and fashion model

Ivy Stephenson Gunter
- Born: June 22, 1950 (age 76); Bellevue, Ohio, U.S.
- Occupations: Fashion model; inspirational speaker; author; fitness enthusiast
- Known for: Osteosarcoma survival and advocacy
- Notable work: On the Ragged Edge of Drop Dead Gorgeous
- Awards: Ohio Women's Hall of Fame (1993)

Ivy Stephenson Gunter (born June 22, 1950, in Bellevue, Ohio) is an amputee, fashion model, osteosarcoma survivor, inspirational speaker, and fitness enthusiast. She is the author of the book On the Ragged Edge of Drop Dead Gorgeous.

In early 1980, she was diagnosed with bone cancer in her right leg, leading to its amputation. Five months after surgery, she returned to filming, with wigs and a prosthetic leg. She returned to modeling shortly thereafter. Gunter was inducted into the Ohio Women's Hall of Fame in 1993.
