= Mary Anne Fackelman-Miner =

American photojournalist (born c.1947)

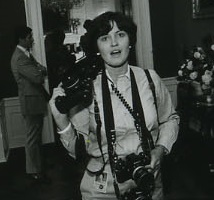
- Fackelman in 1981
- Born: Mary Anne Fackelman c. 1947 (age 78–79); Toledo, Ohio
- Occupations: Photographer, photojournalist

Mary Anne Fackelman-Miner (born c.1947) is an American photojournalist and the first woman to serve in an official capacity as White House photographer.

== Biography ==
Fackelman graduated from Mary Manse College with a BA in sociology/social work and attended the University of Toledo Law School for two years. She worked as a clerk for Judge Geraldine Macelwane when she decided she preferred photography. She then worked two years as a staff photographer at the Toledo Blade before earning a position in the White House in April 1979.

She initially covered First Lady Rosalynn Carter and other general events during the Carter administration. Fackelman was then assigned to Nancy Reagan after the 1980 election. Sheila Tate, Nancy Reagan's press secretary, wrote of Fackelman-Miner, "Maf had an uncanny ability to snap a picture without anyone being aware of her presence; she also had an incredible eye. She caught every emotion. Nancy didn't need to see many of her photos before she knew she wanted Maf, as we came to call her, as part of our team."

Her photographs have been published widely, including in Time magazine, Newsweek, The New York Times, and numerous books.

=== Gallery of work ===
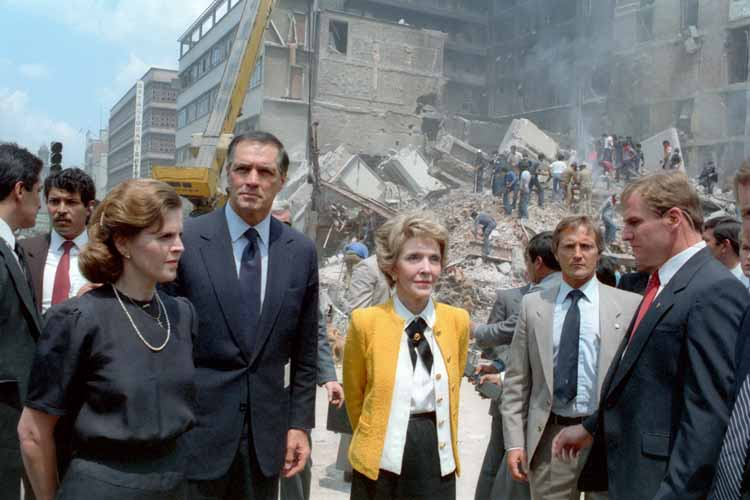
Nancy Reagan (center) surveying damage from the 1985 Mexico City earthquake

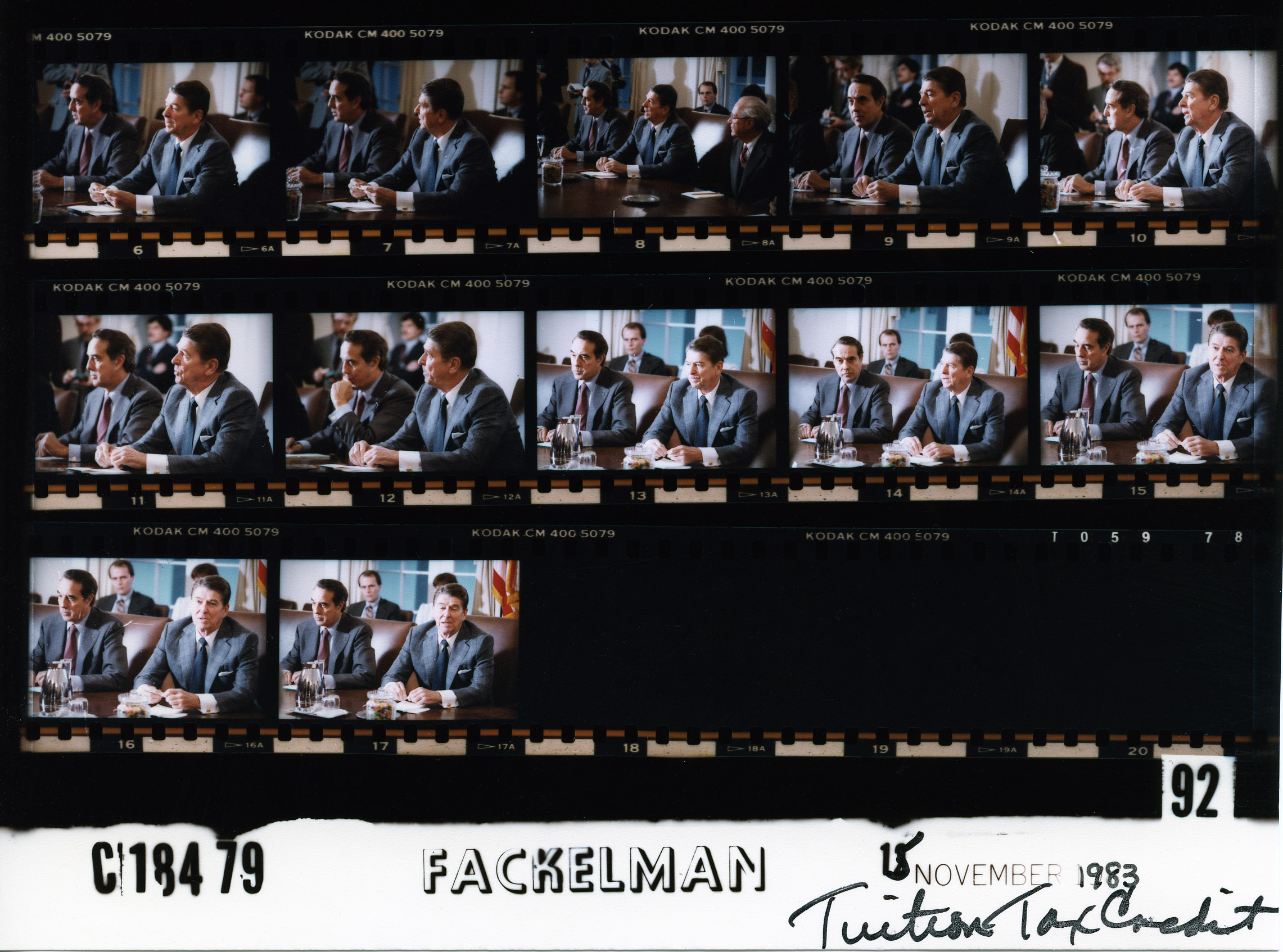
Contact sheet of Fackelman's photos from the Reagan Library

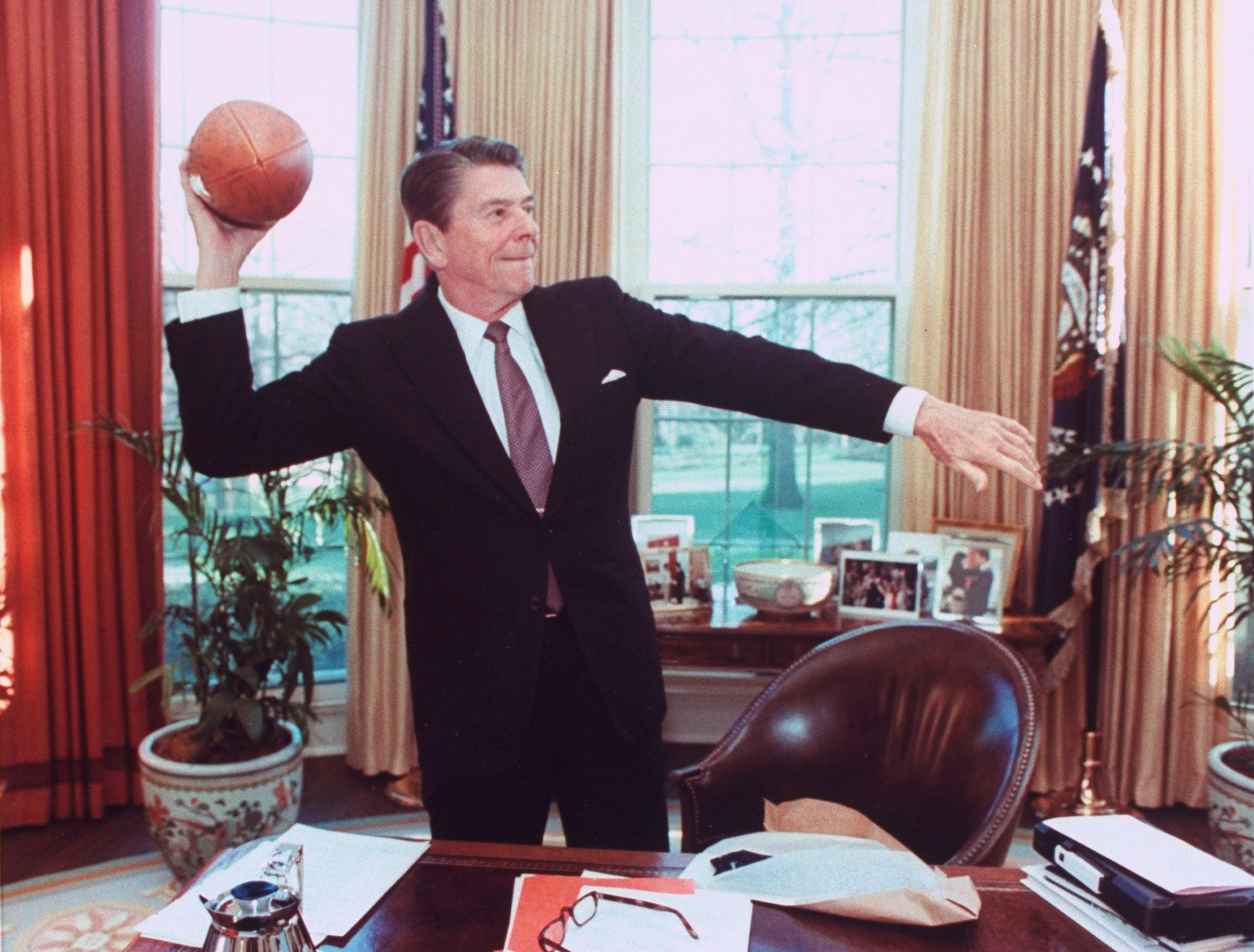
President Ronald Reagan with a football in the Oval Office

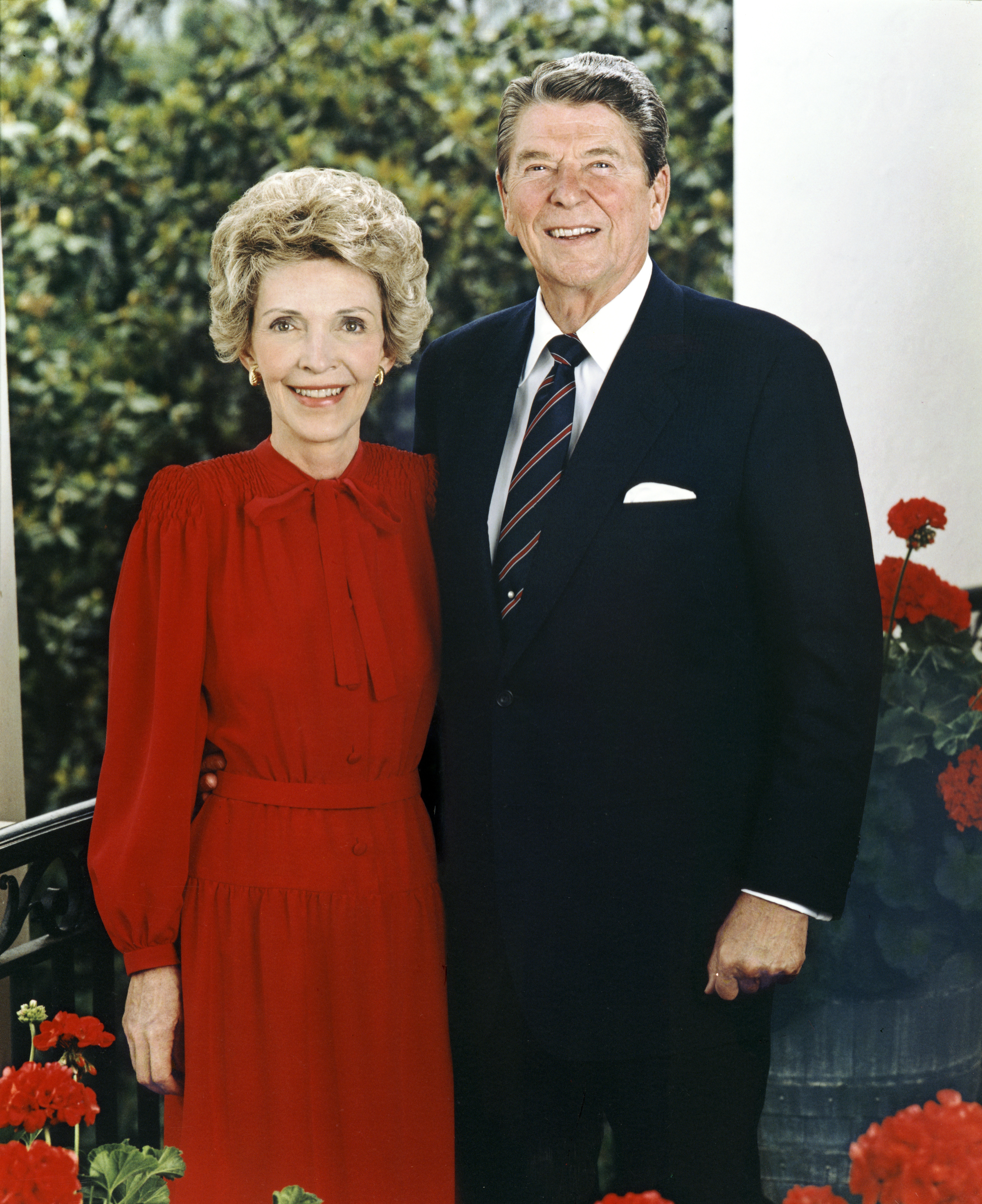
Official portrait of the Reagans 1985
