= Lottie Randolph =

Prominent agriculturist in Ohio

Lottie Randolph (1886 or 1887 in Fairfield County, Ohio – January 24, 1968 in Columbus, Ohio) was a prominent agriculturist in the State of Ohio.

== Biography ==
She was born in Rushville, Ohio. In 1931, she received her master farm homemaker degree from Ohio State University. In 1936, her husband Frank M. Randolph, a farmer, died.

Randolph was the assistant director of the Department of Agriculture in Ohio from 1939 to 1944 and 1947 to 1948, under two Governors. In this role, she worked to protect the consumer, distributor and farmer by improving market news reporting and the grading and inspection regulations. One important component was to educate the consumer by standardizing label information to guide the consumer to making the best purchase.

During World War II, she worked to recruit women for the Women’s Land Army as assistant director of Farm Labor at Ohio State University.

In 1950, Randolph announced her candidacy for Ohio Secretary of State. She ultimately lost the Republican nomination to Ted W. Brown.

In 1953, she was appointed assistant to the administrator of the farmers’ home administration.

== Death and legacy ==
Randolph died in 1968.

Randolph was posthumously inducted into the Ohio Women’s Hall of Fame and the Ohio Agriculture Hall of Fame in 1978.
