= Anna Biggins =

Anna Ash Biggins (born October 31, 1933) was an American labor organizer and a GM Lordstown factory worker.

Biggins was born on October 31, 1933, in Youngstown, Ohio, and married Nathaniel Biggins in 1960. After serving in leadership for UAW Local 1112, Biggins served as the international representative for UAW Region 2 and as a delegate to the 1980 Democratic National Convention. Biggins was inducted into the Ohio Women's Hall of Fame in 1988.
