= Consolata Kline =

Former executive director of St. Elizabeth Hospital Medical Center (Youngstown, Ohio)

Sister Consolata M. Kline (October 8, 1916 – November 7, 2016) was a religious sister of the Catholic Church and the Executive Director of the St. Elizabeth Hospital Medical Center.

== Career ==
Rita Kline was born in Cleveland, Ohio on October 8, 1916, where she graduated from Lincoln High School in 1935. She entered the Sisters of Humility of Mary in 1943 after working through the Great Depression. She made her first profession of vows in July 1945 and her perpetual vows in 1948.

Kline attended St. Louis University where she received her bachelor of science in commerce and her masters in hospital administration. She was hired at the St. Elizabeth Hospital Medical Center in 1945 as business office manager in Youngstown, Ohio and eventually became the hospital's Executive Director.

During her tenure, she grew the hospital from a general medical-surgical hospital to a health care center offering the latest in technology and facilities. She retired in 2001 when she was elected Major Superior of the Sisters of Humility of Mary.

Kline was inducted into the Ohio Women's Hall of Fame in 1978. In 2000, she received the papal honor "Cross Pro-Ecclesia et Pontifice" for her service to the Church.

== Death ==
Sister Consolata died November 7, 2016, in Villa Maria, Pennsylvania at age 100. She was preceded in death by her sister, Betty Ondus, and her brothers Thomas Kline, Rev. John J. Kline, and Rev. Robert W. Kline.
