= Hattie Larlham =

American nonprofit organization

- Named after: Hattie Lena Gadd Larlham
- Formation: 1961
- Founder: Hattie Larlham
- Type: Nonprofit
- Purpose: Helping people with developmental disabilities
- Headquarters: Mantua, Ohio
- Location: United States
- Region served: Ohio
- Website: hattielarlham.org

Hattie Larlham is an American nonprofit organization that creates opportunities for more than 1,600 children and adults with intellectual and developmental disabilities in the state of Ohio. Services provided encompass medical, work training and employment, recreational, educational, and residential, catering to both children and adults.

Named after its founder, Hattie Gadd Larlham, the organization is headquartered in Mantua, Ohio. In 2021, it celebrated its 60th anniversary.

In 2016, Hattie Larlham was named one of the 99 best places to work in Northeast Ohio for the seventh time.

== History ==
Hattie Lena Gadd Larlham created her organization in 1961 and legally established the Hattie Larlham Foundation in 1963. She became inspired to action when, as a nurse, she experienced first-hand the lack of specialized care available for children with developmental disabilities. She took a neighbor's daughter, who was born with inoperable hydrocephalus, into her home to provide care for the child. Not long after, she was caring for ten children in her family's small farmhouse and soon had a waiting list of 100 children.

Larlham drew national attention for her efforts and eventually served as a disabilities issue advisor to U.S. Presidents Jimmy Carter, Ronald Reagan, and George H. W. Bush. Her accomplishments also earned her a place in the Ohio Women's Hall of Fame. She died in 1996 and is buried at the Hattie Larlham Center for Children with Disabilities.

In 2008, Hattie Larlham completed a three-year, $16–million-dollar renovation and expansion of its flagship location, the Hattie Larlham Center for Children with Disabilities.

In 2015, the nonprofit officially expanded its services to central Ohio when it acquired the Association for the Developmentally Disabled (ADD), headquartered in Westerville, Ohio.

== Community-based programs ==
Constant Companions

Constant Companions is Hattie Larlham's adult day support program. The program maintains seven locations throughout northeast Ohio: Uniontown, Twinsburg, Barberton, North Canton, Bedford Heights, Stow, and Middleburg Heights. The program emphasizes community integration, volunteerism, civic engagement, and education.

Hattie's Doggie Day Care & Boarding

Hattie's Doggie Day Care & Boarding was a pet boarding operation with locations in Cleveland, North Canton, and Twinsburg. These facilities offered day care and long-term boarding for dogs, as well as grooming services. Employees with disabilities cared for the animals as they worked alongside professional job coaches. Hattie's Doggie Day Care & Boarding began with a location in Green, Ohio and expanded to a second site in Twinsburg in August 2010. A third location opened near Cleveland on May 14, 2012. The 5,300-square-foot facility is the largest to date.

== Past Programs ==
Hattie's Creative Arts

Hattie Larlham Creative Arts was a program that gave participants with intellectual and developmental disabilities the opportunity to communicate through artistic expression.

In 2013, artwork from Hattie Larlham Creative Arts was juried into the Orange Park Art Festival in Jacksonville, Florida, and into the Gulf Coast Fine Art Festival in Fort Myers, Florida, solely on its merits, with no special consideration given to the fact that the artists had developmental disabilities.

In August 2015, Hattie's Creative Arts developed a presence at the Summit Artspace. Hattie's Creative Arts worked with the Akron Area Arts Alliance to develop the 596-square-foot space on the third floor of the Summit Artspace building.

Hattie's Gardens

Hattie's Gardens was a work training program that employs adults with intellectual and developmental disabilities. Employees with disabilities learned chemical-free growing practices such as crop rotation to prevent soil depletion, composting, using beneficial insects to manage crop-damaging insects, spreading mulches to suppress weeds, and using disease-resistant cultivars.

Hattie's Gardens maintained locations at Old Trail School in Bath, Ohio and the Akron Zoo in Akron. In addition to employing people with developmental disabilities, Hattie's Gardens at Old Trail School served as a learning center for students and engages them in the entire food cycle. Old Trail School also served produce from Hattie's Gardens in school lunches.

Hattie's Food Hub

In November 2014, The Plain Dealer reported that Hattie Larlham would open a Northeast Ohio Food Hub and Workforce Development Center near the site of Hattie's Gardens at the Akron Zoo. Construction on the project began in the summer of 2015 and was completed in June 2016. Formerly located in the Cedar Douglas neighborhood of Akron, the 4,400-square-foot facility featured a grocery market, a community meeting space, and a commercial processing kitchen. Hattie's Food Hub provided work training to people with intellectual and developmental disabilities. Employees prepared and sell fresh produce grown at Hattie's Gardens and by Northeast Ohio farmers. The center sold produce in an area that was previously classified as a food desert, meaning no fresh produce or food was available within a one-mile radius.
