= Helen Chatfield Black =

American naturalist and conservationist

Helen Black (1924 – June 8, 2018) was an American naturalist and conservationist from the Greater Cincinnati area.

== Biography ==
Helen Black was born in 1924 and grew up in Indian Hill area of Cincinnati. After graduating from Vassar College with a degree in English in 1945, she and her husband settled in Indian Hill and committed herself to conservation, having been inspired by an elementary teacher, Louis Brand, at the Lotspeich School and Dr. Emma Lucy Braun, a prominent botanist, ecologist and expert on the forests of the eastern United States.

Black was one of the founders of the Cincinnati Nature Center (CNC), the nation's largest member-supported nature center, in 1965 and Little Miami Inc. She served as vice president of the CNC from 1967 to 1977, later becoming a teaching volunteer, land steward, and active honor trustee and lands committee member. Black was president of the Ohio chapter of The Nature Conservancy from 1976 to 1978 and board member of the Ohio Environmental Council.

Black was instrumental in the merger that created the Cincinnati Museum Center at Union Terminal in 1983. For 20 years, she was on the board of the Cincinnati Museum of Natural History at Gilbert Avenue advocating the merger between the museum and the Cincinnati Historical Society at Union Terminal. In 1995, she joined the board of directors, serving until 2004, when she was named a lifetime emeritus trustee.

She also worked with other regional conservation groups including: Edge of Appalachia Preserve, Greenacres, Indian Hill Garden Club, Redbird Hollow Association, Cincinnati Wildflower Preservation Society, Southwest Ohio Regional Transit Authority, and Shelterhouse.

== Awards and legacy ==
In 1972, the Garden Club of America awarded Black the Medal of Merit for Conservation. In 1973, she was awarded the Oak Leaf Award from The Nature Conservancy as well as the Ohio Department of Natural Resources Conservation Award. She was inducted into the Ohio Women's Hall of Fame in 1978. In 1981, the Garden Club of America presented her with the Margaret Douglas medal for outstanding service to conservation education. She was nominated along with her husband, Robert L. Black Jr., in 1997 for the Jacob E. Davis Volunteer Leadership Award. In 2012, the CNC honored her for her work in conservation in the Greater Cincinnati region at their first Awards dinner, where she received the Wood Thrush Award and the creation of the Helen C. Black Conservation Fund, which raises funds to be used for land acquisition and purchasing of conservation easements that curb development in wild areas. In 2017, she won the Lifetime Achievement Award from the Ohio Environmental Council. In 2020, The Nature Conservancy completed and officially opened the Helen C. Black Trail in honor of Black.
