= Janet Kalven =

American feminist educator and activist

- Born: May 21, 1913
- Died: April 24, 2014 (aged 100)
- Education: University of Chicago; Boston University
- Occupations: Catholic educator, writer
- Known for: Associated with the Grail movement

Janet Kalven (May 21, 1913 – April 24, 2014) was a Catholic educator and writer associated with the Grail, a women's religious movement founded in 1921.

== Early life and education ==
Kalven was born in Chicago, Illinois, the daughter of Rose Nathan and Harry Kalven. After finishing high school as valedictorian of her class, she attended the University of Chicago, where writer Jane Kesner was her friend and assigned "big sister". Janet graduated from the University of Chicago in 1934. Later in life she earned a master's degree in adult education from Boston University. Her family background was Jewish, but Kalven became a Roman Catholic convert as a young woman.

== Career ==
Kalven joined the Grail Movement, a Catholic women's group, in 1940, and in 1944 was one of the founders of its main educational center, a farm called Grailville, in Loveland, Ohio. She would eventually write a memoir and history of the movement in the United States, Women Breaking Boundaries: A Grail Journey, 1940-1995 (SUNY Press 1999). Kalven was on staff at the University of Dayton and was director of the Seminary Quarter at Grailville, in the 1970s. She co-organized the historic ecumenical conference "Women Exploring Theology" at Grailville in 1972. Ten years later, she co-hosted the "Women's Spirit Bonding" conference, also at Grailville. In 1988, she co-edited With Both Eyes Open: Seeing Beyond Gender, a collection of essays on women, Christian theology, and liturgy.

In 1990 Kalven was inducted into the Ohio Women's Hall of Fame. Kalven was the 2003 co-recipient of the Enduring Spirit Award, presented by MUSE: The Cincinnati Women's Choir. She was a trustee of Housetop Center for Women's Ministries. Among the women influenced by Kalven's work at Grailville were Mary E. Hunt and Elisabeth Schüssler Fiorenza.

Of her work, Kalven declared,

I ground my hope for the world and for the Grail chiefly in the strength of women, women who develop all of their gifts and talents, women who act together generously and in hope to bring into reality their vision of a world where difference does not connote domination, a world where each person and culture will grow and enrich the others, a world where a hope-filled future awaits every child. We hold fast to our conviction that terror, poverty, and oppression will not have the last word.

== Personal life ==
Late in life, Kalven moved from Grailville to buy a converted school building in Cincinnati, Ohio, where she lived. She joined others who were committed to creating affordable housing for women. Kalven died April 24, 2014, at age 100, in Milford, Ohio.
