= Rebecca =

Rebecca, Rebekah, or similar, may refer to:

== People ==
- Rebecca (given name), a feminine name of Hebrew origin
  - List of people with given name Rebecca, including fictional characters
- Rebecca (biblical figure), wife of Isaac and the mother of Jacob and Esau
- Rebecca, from Acts of Xanthippe, Polyxena, and Rebecca
- Rebecca (Rafqa), Lebanese Maronite nun
- Rebekah (DJ), producer of industrial techno
- Rebeca Pous Del Toro (born 1978), known professionally as Rebeca, Spanish singer
- Rebeca Silva Cosío (1925–2002), known professionally as Rebeca, Mexican singer
- Rebekah Johnson (born 1976), also known as Rebekah, American singer-songwriter
- Rebeca (footballer)

== Arts, entertainment, and media ==
=== Literature ===
- Rebecca of Sunnybrook Farm, a 1903 children's novel by Kate Douglas Wiggin
- Rebecca (novel), 1938, by Daphne du Maurier
- Rebekah (novel), 2001, by Orson Scott Card

=== Films ===
- Rebecca (1940 film), directed by Alfred Hitchcock based on du Maurier's novel
- Rebecca, a 1952 Filipino film starring Tessie Agana and Van De Leon
- Rebecca (1963 film), a Malayalam film directed by Kunchacko
- Rebecca (2016 film), a Ghana-Nigeria film directed by Shirley Frimpong-Manso
- Rebecca (2020 film), a British Netflix original film directed by Ben Wheatley based on du Maurier's novel

=== Songs ===
- "Rebecca", 2011, by the Russian band Tesla Boy
- "Rebecca Came Back from Mecca," a 1921 song popular in the US
- "Rebecca", on the 1975 Flo and Eddie album, Illegal, Immoral and Fattening
- "Rebecca", on the 2016 Against Me! Album, "Shape Shift With Me"
- "Rebeca", by Johnny Ventura Y Su Combo Show 1984
- "Rebeca", by Enanitos Verdes from Néctar (album)
- "Rebeca", by MC Livinho, Gerek and Maejor 2018

=== Television ===
- Rebeca (telenovela), a 2003 Spanish-language telenovela
- Rebecca (1979 TV series), 1979 serial directed by Simon Langton based on du Maurier's novel
- Rebecca (1997 TV series), 1997 serial directed by Jim O'Brien based on du Maurier's novel
- "Rebecca" (Better Call Saul), an episode

=== Other uses in arts, entertainment, and media ===
- Rebecca (band), a 1980s Japanese pop band fronted by Nokko
- Rebecca (musical), 2006, by Michael Kunze and Sylvester Levay

== Places ==
- Rebecca, Georgia, US

== Science and technology ==
=== Computing ===
- Rebeca (programming language), an actor-based programming language
- "RebeccaPurple", a hex color (#663399 ), used in various computer technologies

=== Other ===
- 572 Rebekka, a minor planet
- Rebecca (protist), a genus of algae in the order Pavlovales

== Other uses ==
- Rebecca Hair Products, Chinese manufacturer of hair products
- International Association of Rebekah Assemblies, a service organization
- Rabeca, a fiddle from northeastern Brazil and northern Portugal
- Rebecca (raccoon), a pet raccoon kept by president Calvin Coolidge
- Rebecca, a Mitsubishi Canter modified truck
- Rebecca Riots of nineteenth-century South Wales
- Rebec, sometimes rebecha, rebeckha, a bowed string instrument of the Medieval and early Renaissance eras
- Rebecca, a British brig raided by the Spanish in 1731, an incident instrumental in causing the War of Jenkin's Ear

== See also ==
- Becca, a female given name
- Becki (disambiguation)
- Becky (disambiguation)
- List of storms named Rebecca
- Rivkah (disambiguation)
