= Becky =

Becky is a feminine given name, often a short form (hypocorism) of Rebecca. It may refer to:

== People ==
- Becky (television personality), Japanese celebrity
- Becky Anderson (born 1967), British journalist and news anchor
- Becky Ann Baker (born 1953), American actress
- Becky Bell (1971–1988), American teenager who died as a result of an abortion
- Becky Bios, Mexican activist, biologist, teacher
- Becky Buller, U.S. musician
- Becky Carney (born 1944), American politician
- Becky Chambers (born 1985), American science-fiction writer
- Becky Downie (born 1992), British artistic gymnast
- Becky Easton (born 1974), English footballer
- Becky Edelsohn (1892–1973), American anarchist and hunger striker
- Becky Edwards (disambiguation)
- Becky Flaherty (born 1998), Scottish footballer
- Becky G (born 1997), American singer
- Becky Hammon (born 1977), American-Russian basketball coach
- Becky Hill (born 1994), English singer and songwriter
- Becky Hobbs (born 1950), American country singer, songwriter, and pianist
- Becky Kennedy, American clinical psychologist and writer
- Becky Lee (born 1978), Hong Kong actress and host
- Becky Lynch, (born 1987) Irish professional wrestler and actress
- Becky Sandstedt, American filmmaker and animal welfare activist
- Becky Sauerbrunn (born 1985), American soccer player
- Becky Southworth, British television presenter
- Becky Skillman (born 1950), American politician
- Becky Taylor, later known as Riva Taylor (born 1988), British singer
- Becky Watts (1998–2015), British teenage murder victim
- Becky Worley (born 1971), American journalist and broadcaster
- Becky Yee (born 1969), American portrait photographer

== Fictional characters ==
- Aunt Becky, the supporting character in the ABC sitcom Full House
- Becky, from The Loud House
- Becky, a character from Animal Crossing
- Becky, a character in the movie 13 Going on 30
- Becky, a supporting character in the 2016 animated film Finding Dory
- Becky, a porcupine in the animated film Sing
- Becky Bicklehoff, a recurring character in the Disney Channel series Liv and Maddie
- Becky Blackbell, a character in the Spy x Family series
- Becky Bloomwood, the main protagonist of the Shopaholic series of novels by Sophie Kinsella
- Becky Botsford, the main protagonist of the television series WordGirl
- Becky Conner, one of the main characters of the sitcoms "Roseanne" and "The Conners"
- Becky Feder, in the films Grown Ups and 2
- Becky Jackson, a character from the musical series Glee
- Becky Thatcher, in Mark Twain's novel The Adventures of Tom Sawyer
- Becky Williams, a character in the musical drama show Empire
- A titular character of Becky and Barnaby Bear, a British children's television series
- Becky (Spider-Girl), a character from the comic series Peter Parker
- Becky the Best Friend Fairy, a character in Rainbow Magic

== See also ==
- Becki (disambiguation)
