= Beca =

Beca may refer to:

- Beca (artist group), group of artists formed in the 1970s in Wales
- Beca Group, engineering and consultancy services companies
- Beca (garment), a form of stole worn on the breast and shoulder by tunos
- Beca (musician), American singer
- Cycle rickshaw

== Persons with the surname ==
- Andon Beça (1879–1944), Albanian politician
- Damir Beća (born 1969), Bosnian football player and manager
- Matt Beca (born 1986), Canadian ice hockey player
- Ramón Beca (born 1953), Spanish equestrian

== See also ==
- Bangladesh Environment Conservation Act
- Becca, a given name
