= Masterson (surname) =

Masterson is a surname that originated in the British Isles. It is most commonly found in Ireland where it has often been used as the anglicised form of a Fermanagh sept Mac an Mhaighistir (McMaster), not to be confused with the Scottish McMaster(s). Notable people with the surname include:

- Alanna Masterson (born 1988), American actress
- Bat Masterson (1853–1921), gunfighter, lawman, sports writer
- Chase Masterson (born 1963), American actress
- Christina Masterson (born 1989), American actress
- Christopher Masterson (born 1980), American actor
- Danny Masterson (born 1976), American actor, older brother of Christopher Masterson
- Emma Masterson (born 1977), Thai actress, model and television presenter
- Fay Masterson (born 1974), English actress
- James F. Masterson (1926–2010), American psychiatrist
- Jordan Masterson (born 1986), American actor
- Justin Masterson (born 1985), American baseball player
- Kelly Masterson, American screenwriter
- Lisa Masterson (born 1966) OB/GYN on the talk show The Doctors
- Luke Masterson (born 1998), American football player
- Martha Gay Masterson (1837–1916), American settler and diarist
- Mary Stuart Masterson (born 1966), American actress
- Paul Masterson, Northern Irish music producer
- Paul Masterson (baseball) (1915–1997), American Major League Baseball pitcher
- Reba Byrd Masterson, Texas geologist
- Rod Masterson (1945–2013), American actor
- Ronnie Masterson (1926–2014), Irish actress
- Valerie Masterson (born 1937), English opera singer
- Walt Masterson (1920–2008), American baseball pitcher
- Walter Masterson (born 1978), American comedian
- Wayne Masterson (1959–1991), British scientist
- William Masterson (1910–1984), American priest and educator

== Fictional characters ==
- Teresa Masterson, a character from the Australian soap opera Home and Away; portrayed by Simone McAullay
- Jill Masterson, from Goldfinger
- Cookie Masterson, character from American trivia party game You Don't Know Jack; portrayed by Tom Gottlieb
- Jen Masterson, fictional character on Canadian cartoon series 6teen
- Henry Masterson, fictional character on the American cartoon series Transformers Animated
