= Sarah =

Biblical matriarch

- שָׂרָה
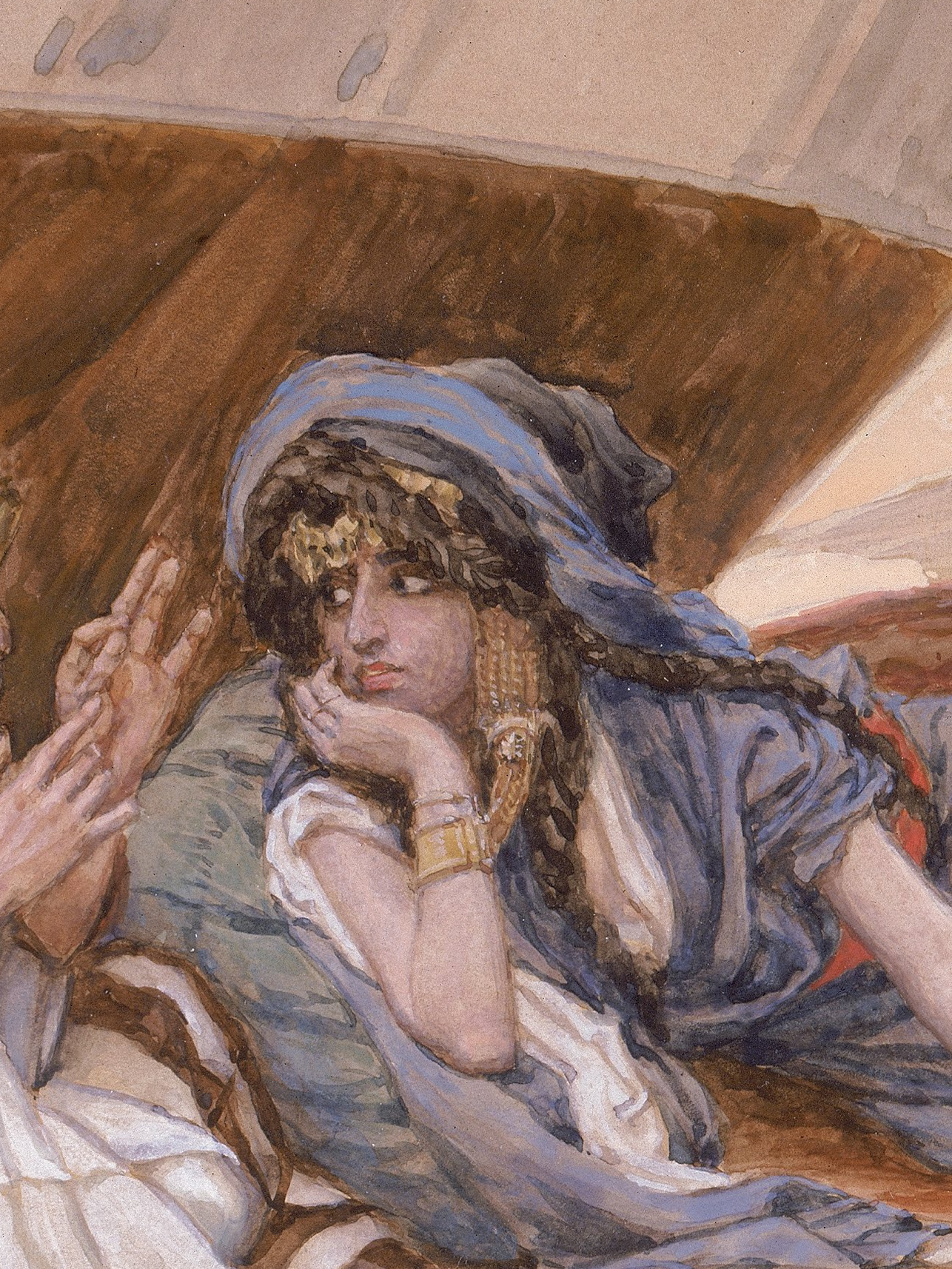
- Abram's Counsel to Sarai (1896–1902) by James Tissot

Personal life
- Born: Ur of the Chaldees
- Died: Hebron, Canaan
- Buried: Cave of the Patriarchs
- Spouse: Abraham
- Children: Isaac

Sarah (Note: Hebrew: שָׂרָה, Modern: Sara, Tiberian: Śārā; Arabic: سَارَة, Sārah) (originally Sarai) (Note: שָׂרַי Sārai) is a biblical matriarch, prophet, and major figure in Abrahamic religions. While different Abrahamic faiths portray her differently, Judaism, Christianity, and Islam all depict her character similarly, as that of a pious woman, renowned for her hospitality and beauty, the wife of Abraham, and the mother of Isaac.

== In the Hebrew Bible ==
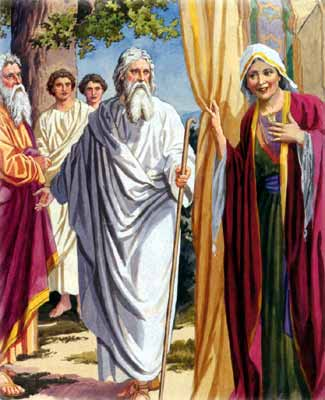
A depiction of Sarah and Abraham

=== Narrative ===
In the biblical narrative, Sarah is the wife of Abraham. She was originally called Sarai. During the narrative of the covenant of circumcision in Genesis 17, God renames Abram and Sarai as Abraham and Sarah, then promises them that they will have a son. According to most modern scholars, both Sarah and Sarai come from the same root SRR, with both meaning "important woman". A minority of scholars derive Sarai from the root SRY, meaning "contend with" or "withstand", similar to the name Israel.

==== Departure from Ur ====
Terah, with Abram (as he was then called), Sarai and Lot, departed for Canaan, but stopped in a place named Harran, where Terah remained until he died at the age of 205. God told Abram to leave his country and his father's house for a land that he would show him, promising to make of him a great nation, bless him, make his name great, bless those who blessed him, and curse "him" that curses him. Following God's command, Abram took his wife Sarai, his nephew Lot, and the wealth and slaves that they had acquired, and traveled to Shechem in Canaan. Abram was 75 at this time.

==== Pharaoh ====
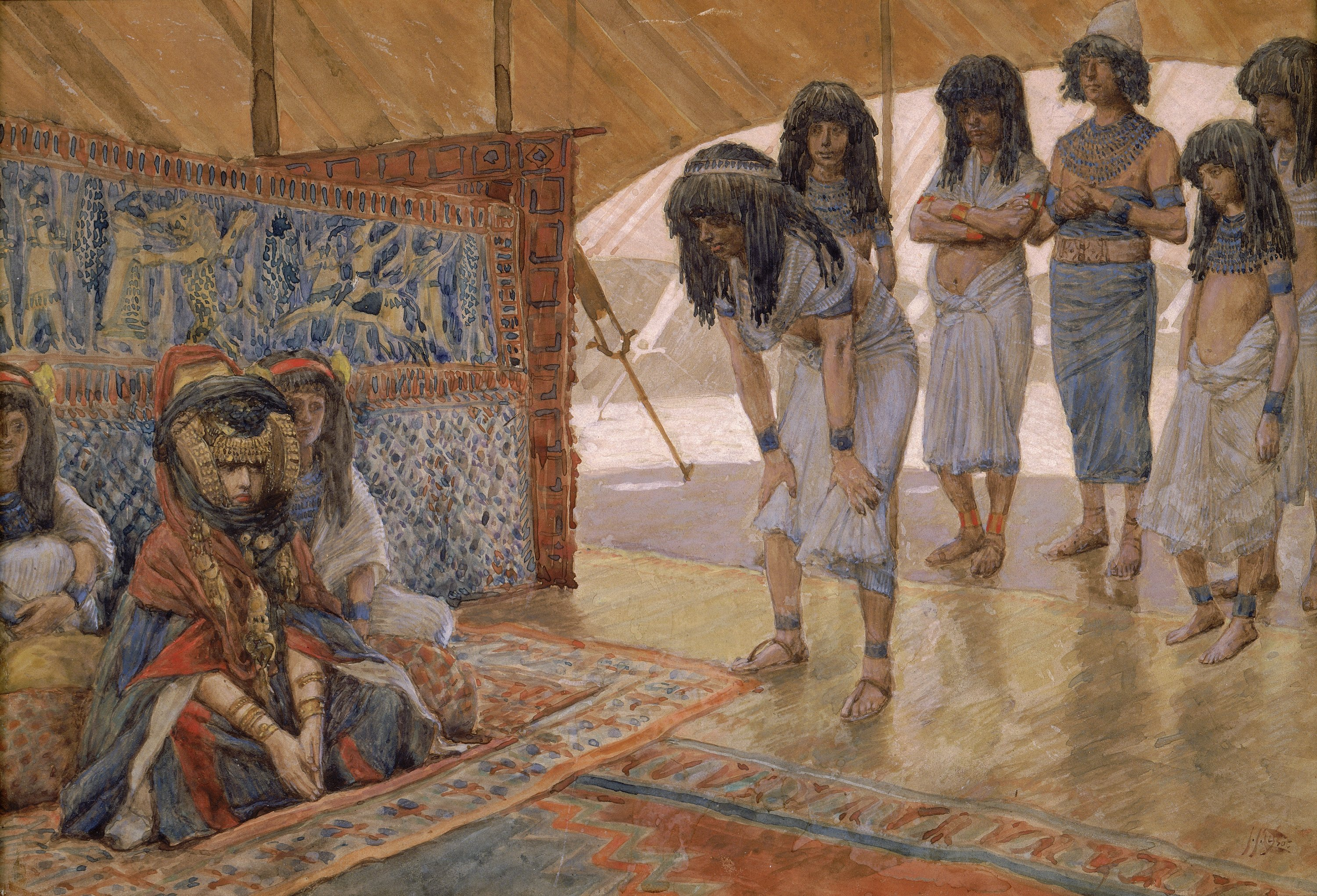
Sarai Is Taken to Pharaoh's Palace by James Tissot.

There was a severe famine in the land of Canaan, so Abram and Lot and their households travelled south to Egypt. On the journey to Egypt, Abram instructed Sarai to identify herself only as his sister, fearing that the Egyptians would kill him in order to take his wife, saying,

I know what a beautiful woman you are. When the Egyptians see you, they will say, 'this is his wife.' Then they will kill me but will let you live. Say you are my sister, so that I will be treated well for your sake and my life will be spared because of you.

When brought before Pharaoh, Sarai said that Abram was her brother, and the king thereupon took her into his palace and bestowed upon Abram many presents and marks of distinction. However, God afflicted Pharaoh's household with great plagues. Pharaoh then realized that Sarai was Abram's wife and demanded that they leave Egypt immediately.

Genesis 16:1 records that Sarai had "an Egyptian servant", Hagar, whom Sarai may have brought with her from this time.

==== Hagar and Ishmael ====
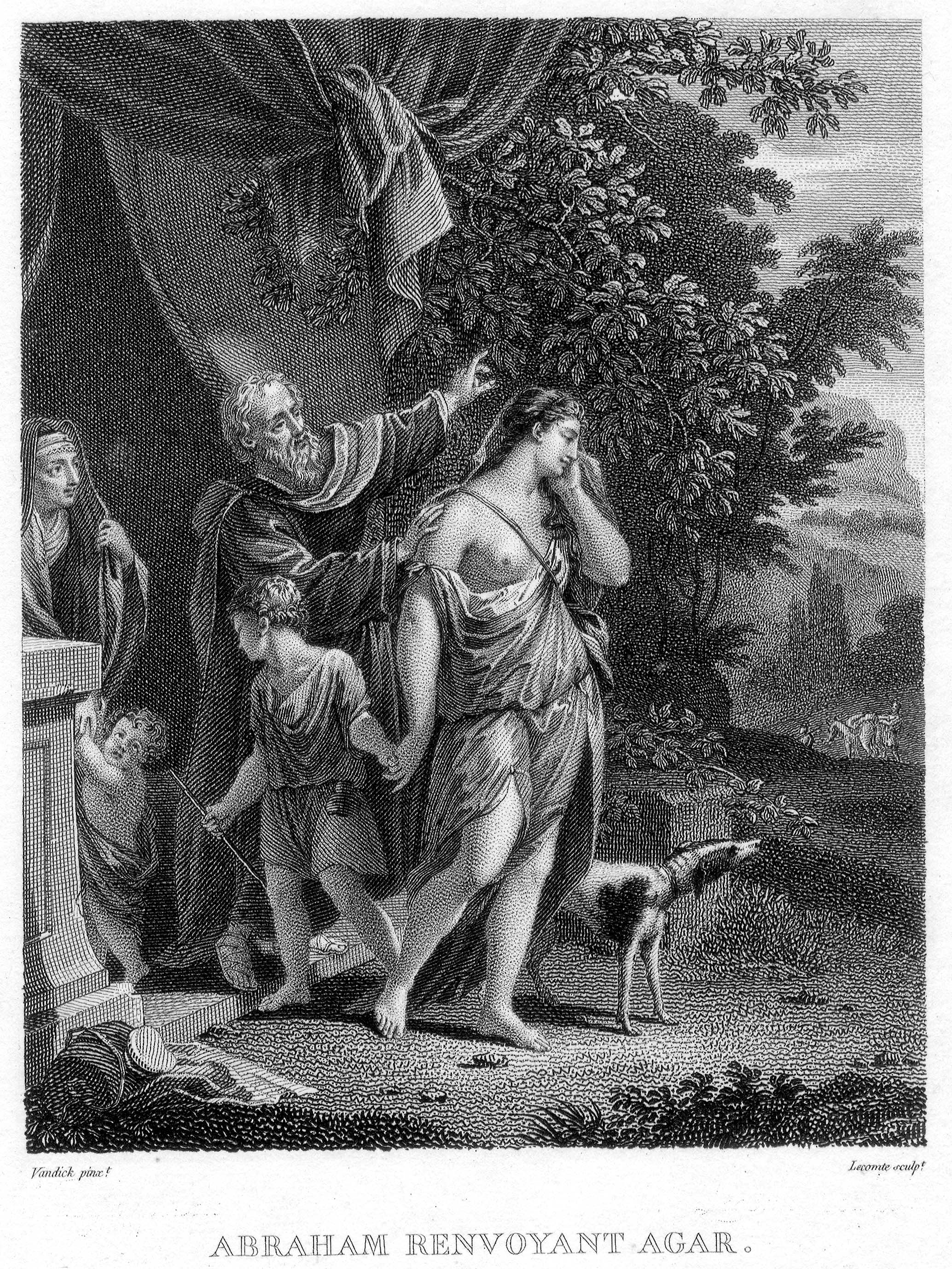
Banishment of Hagar, an 18th century etching from Paris, Fr. Fanet, editor, Rue des Saints Pères n° 10, Sarah is seen at the left, looking on.

After having lived in Canaan for ten years and still childless, Sarai suggested that Abram have a child with her Egyptian handmaiden, Hagar, to which he agreed. Hagar's pregnancy resulted in tension between Sarai and Hagar, and Sarai complained to her husband that the handmaid no longer respected her. At one point, Hagar fled from her mistress but returned after angels consoled her. She gave birth to Abram's son Ishmael when Abram was eighty-six years old.

==== Isaac ====
In Genesis 17, when Abram was ninety-nine years old, God declared his new name: "Abraham" – "a father of many nations", and made the covenant of circumcision with him. God gave Sarai the new name "Sarah", and blessed her. Then God told Abraham that Sarah would have a son and Abraham responded by laughing at the idea of a pregnancy at their advanced age. Not long afterwards, Abraham and Sarah were visited by three men. One of the visitors told Abraham that upon his return next year, Sarah would have a son. While at the tent entrance, Sarah overheard what was said, and she laughed to herself about the prospect of having a child at their ages. The visitor inquired of Abraham why Sarah laughed at the idea of bearing a child, for her age was as nothing to God. Sarah denied laughing, because she was afraid.

Sarah soon became pregnant and bore a son to Abraham, at the very time which had been spoken. The patriarch, then a hundred years old, named the child "Isaac" (Hebrew yitschaq, "laughter") and circumcised him when he was eight days old. For Sarah, the thought of giving birth and nursing a child, at such an old age, also brought her much laughter, as she declared, "God had made me to laugh, [so that] all that hear will laugh with me." Abraham held a great feast on the day when Isaac was weaned. It was during this banquet that Sarah happened upon the then teenaged Ishmael mocking Isaac, and she was so disturbed that she requested that both he and Hagar be banished. Abraham was initially distressed by this, but he relented when told by God to do as his wife had asked.

==== Abimelech ====
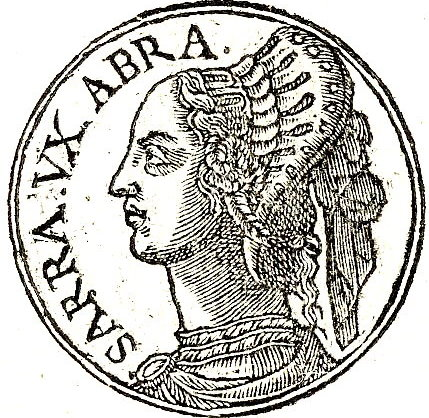
Sarah, as depicted on Promptuarium Iconum Insigniorum (1553) by Guillaume Rouillé

After being visited by the three men, Abraham and Sarah settled between Kadesh and Shur in the land of the Philistines. While he was living in Gerar, Abraham again claimed that Sarah was his sister. King Abimelech subsequently had her brought to him. Later, God came to Abimelech in a dream and declared that taking her would result in death because she was a married woman. Abimelech, who had not laid hands on her, inquired if he would also slay a righteous nation, especially since Abraham had claimed that he and Sarah were siblings. In response, God told Abimelech that he did indeed have a blameless heart and that was why he continued to exist. However, if he did not return Sarah to Abraham, God would surely destroy Abimelech and his entire household. Abimelech was informed that Abraham was a prophet who would pray for him.

Early the next morning, Abimelech informed his servants of his dream and approached Abraham inquiring as to why he had brought such great guilt upon his kingdom. Abraham replied that he thought there was no fear of God in that place, and that they might kill him for his wife. Then Abraham defended what he had said as not being a lie at all: "And yet indeed she is my sister; she is the daughter of my father, but not the daughter of my mother; and she became my wife." Abimelech returned Sarah to Abraham, and gave him gifts of sheep, oxen, and servants; and invited him to settle wherever he pleased in Abimelech's lands. Further, Abimelech gave Abraham a thousand pieces of silver to serve as Sarah's vindication before all. Abraham then prayed for Abimelech and his household, since God had stricken the women with infertility because of the taking of Sarah.

==== Death ====
Sarah died at the age of 127. Abraham mourned after her death, and bought a piece of land with a cave near Hebron from Ephron the Hittite in which to bury her. This was the first land owned by the Israelites in Canaan, according to the biblical narrative. The place became known as the Cave of the Patriarchs.

After her death, Abraham married Keturah, whose identity midrashic writers and biblical scholars have debated (that is, whether or not she was actually Hagar), and together they had at least six more children.

Isaac found comfort after the death of his mother in his marriage to Rebekah.

=== Later Hebrew Bible references ===
Sarah is mentioned alongside Abraham in Isaiah 51:2:

Look to Abraham your father, and to Sarah who bore you.

== New Testament references ==
The First Epistle of Peter praises Sarah for obeying her husband. She is praised for her faith in the Hebrews "hall of faith" passage alongside a number of other Old Testament figures. Other New Testament references to Sarah are in Romans and Galatians. In Galatians 4, she and Hagar are used as an allegory of the old and new covenants:

"For it is written that Abraham had two sons, one by the slave woman and the other by the free woman. His son by the slave woman was born in the ordinary way; but his son by the free woman was born as the result of a promise. These things may be taken figuratively, for the women represent two covenants. One covenant is from Mount Sinai and bears children who are to be slaves: This is Hagar. Now Hagar stands for Mount Sinai and corresponds to the present city of Jerusalem, because she is in slavery with her children. But the Jerusalem that is above is free, and she is our mother...Now you, brothers, like Isaac, are children of promise...Therefore, brothers, we are not children of the slave woman, but of the free woman."

== Historicity ==
In the early and middle 20th century, leading archaeologists such as William Foxwell Albright and biblical scholars such as Albrecht Alt believed that the patriarchs and matriarchs were either real individuals or believable composites of people who lived in the "patriarchal age", the 2nd millennium BCE. But in the 1970s, new arguments concerning Israel's past and the biblical texts challenged these views; these arguments can be found in Thomas L. Thompson's The Historicity of the Patriarchal Narratives (1974), and John Van Seters' Abraham in History and Tradition (1975). Thompson, a literary scholar, based his argument on archaeology and ancient texts. His thesis centered on the lack of compelling evidence that the patriarchs lived in the 2nd millennium BCE, and noted how certain biblical texts reflected first-millennium conditions and concerns. Van Seters examined the patriarchal stories and argued that their names, social milieu, and messages strongly suggested that they were Iron Age creations. By the beginning of the 21st century, archaeologists had given up hope of recovering any context that would make the patriarchs and matriarchs credible historical figures.

== Religious views ==
=== In Judaism ===
Sarah first appears in the Book of Genesis, while the Midrash and Aggadah provide some additional commentary on her life and role within Judaism and its ancestral form, Yahwism. She is born Sarai (Hebrew: שָׂרַי) in Ur Kaśdim, or Ur of the Chaldees, believed to have been in present-day Iraq, 1,958 Anno Mundi, according to the Hebrew calendar. She was the daughter of Haran and the granddaughter of Terah, an idolater who worshiped the Moon god Nanna and high-ranking servant of Nimrod, the king of Shinar, or Mesopotamia, but not of his wife, Amathlai. Her name is a feminine form of sar (Hebrew: שַׂר), meaning "chieftain" or "prince". Through Terah, she would have been a 10th-generation descendant of Noah, still alive, living in the Mountains of Ararat, and over nine centuries old at the time of her birth. No details are given as to her life or her religious beliefs before Abraham's return to Ur Kaśdim to thwart Nimrod's efforts to proclaim himself a god. It is known she wed Abraham, then called Abram, sometime between the ages of forty and five and following her husband's public humiliation of Nimrod, she, along with her father Terah, her orphaned nephew Lot, her manservant Eliezer, and some three hundred others left Ur Kaśdim for Canaan, the present-day Levant, to save Abraham from a plot by Nimrod to destroy him, commanded to do so by God.

En route to Canaan, the group stopped in Harran, possibly located in present-day Turkey, settling there for some twenty years, until God urged them to move on and so, they left Terah behind to live out his days, and traveled through Shechem and Bethel, both cities in the present-day West Bank, and, when a famine strikes the region, to Mizraim, present-day Egypt. While in Mizraim, Sarah's beauty attracts the attention of Pharaoh and Abraham, fearing the Egyptians would kill him if they knew Sarah was married to him, introduces himself as her brother and so, Pharaoh bestows upon Abraham great wealth, in the form of livestock and slaves, including Hagar, so that he may take Sarah as his concubine, to live in his palace with him. For Pharaoh's unintentional transgression against Abraham, he and members of his household, save for Sarah, are stricken with plague. Pharaoh then realizes that Abraham is Sarah's husband, not only her brother. Despite Abraham's willful deceit of Pharaoh, Pharaoh does not punish Abraham nor does he require the return of the wealth Abram was given in exchange for Sarah. However, he orders them to leave Mizraim. After leaving Mizraim, Lot splits from their group amicably. He eventually settles in Sodom, over disputes related to the livestock.

They returned to Canaan, and a decade passed and still, she and Abraham had no children. Thus, Sarah offered Hagar, her slavewoman, as a concubine to her husband so that he may have a child. Hagar became pregnant with Ishmael. During Hagar's pregnancy, Sarah and Hagar's relationship deteriorated rapidly, with Sarah striking her and Hagar fleeing into the desert to avoid her, returning only at the urging of angels. God then told Abraham that Sarah would give him a son. Sarah, then ninety years old, laughed at this idea. But, as prophesied, she became pregnant with Isaac and she nursed him herself. She would ultimately demand that Abraham send Hagar and Ishmael away and so, Abraham banished them and sent them into the desert.

Sometime after the birth of Ishmael but before the birth of Isaac, Sarah and Abraham travel to Gerar, as described in Genesis 20, where events took place which mirrored those of Mizraim, in which a king, this time Abimelech, took an interest in Sarah for her beauty and, as he had done in Mizraim, Abraham presented himself as her brother instead of her husband and so, believing her unmarried Abimelech took her into her house as Pharaoh had though, this time, God intervened before he touched Sarah, through dreams and plague. Abimelech confronted Abraham, angry that his lie had caused him to provoke the wrath of a god, but, also like Pharaoh, he bestows great wealth upon Abraham. The two men part amicably, with Abraham saying he will pray for the king, who is childless and without an heir.

Sarah died at the age of 127 years. According to rabbinic tradition in the Midrash, her passing was directly connected to the shock of the Binding of Isaac. Midrashic accounts vary on the exact emotional cause: some state she died from immediate grief upon hearing that her son was about to be sacrificed, others record that Satan intentionally deceived her into believing Isaac had already been slaughtered causing her to die of a broken heart, while a third tradition states that Satan later corrected his report and informed her that Isaac had survived, causing her to die of overwhelming joy upon learning that he was actually alive. She is buried in Kiryat Arba, in Hebron, in the Cave of Machpela.

==== In rabbinic literature ====
The Talmud identifies Sarai with Iscah, daughter of Abraham's deceased brother Haran, so that in this Sarah turns out to be the niece of Abraham and the sister of Lot and Milcah. While in Genesis 20:12 Abraham claims that Sarah "is indeed my sister, my father's daughter" rather than his niece, Rashi asserts that the term "daughter" can also be used regarding a granddaughter, and thus "sister" can be used regarding a niece.

The fifth-century rabbinic midrash Genesis Rabbah dedicates a large amount of attention to Sarah in particular. Not only are a relatively large number of drashot dedicated to the matriarch, but she is repeatedly depicted as a model of personal and religious excellence. This is marked break from the biblical and Second Temple literature in which she plays a far more ancillary role. In light of parallels between the rabbis' characterization of Sarah and early Christian themes connected to the Virgin Mary popular in this same period, it has been suggested that the rabbis used their portrayal of Sarah to establish her as a Jewish alternative to the Virgin Mary.

When brought before Pharaoh, Sarah said that Abram was her brother, and the king thereupon bestowed upon the latter many presents and marks of distinction. As a token of his love for Sarai the king deeded his entire property to her, and gave her the land of Goshen as her hereditary possession: for this reason the Israelites subsequently lived in that land. Sarai prayed to God to deliver her from the king, and He thereupon sent an angel, who struck Pharaoh whenever he attempted to touch her. Pharaoh was so astonished at these blows that he spoke kindly to Sarai, who confessed that she was Abraham's wife. The king then ceased to annoy her. According to another version, Pharaoh persisted in annoying her after she had told him that she was a married woman; thereupon the angel struck him so violently that he became ill, and was thereby prevented from continuing to trouble her. According to one tradition it was when Pharaoh saw these miracles wrought in Sarai's behalf that he gave her his daughter Hagar as slave, saying: "It is better that my daughter should be a slave in the house of such a woman than mistress in another house." Abimelech acted likewise. In Genesis 17:15, God changes her name to Sarah (princess) ("a woman of high rank") as part of the covenant with El Shaddai after Hagar bears Abram his first born son Ishmael.

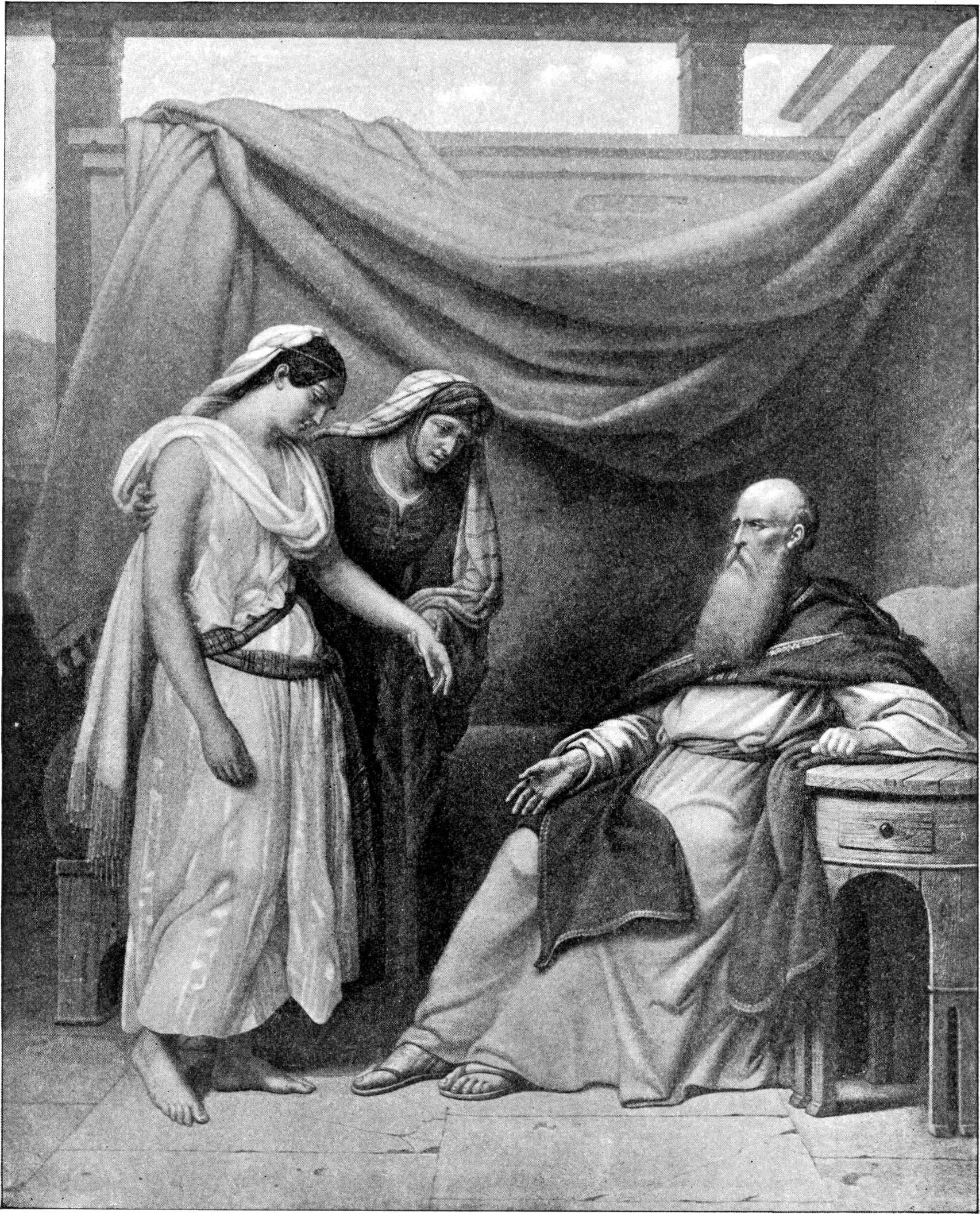
Abraham, Sarah and Hagar, imagined here in a Bible illustration from 1897.

Sarai treated Hagar well, and induced women who came to visit her to visit Hagar also. Hagar, when pregnant by Abraham, began to act superciliously toward Sarai, provoking the latter to treat her harshly, to impose heavy work upon her, and even to strike her. Some believe Sarai was originally destined to reach the age of 175 years, but forty-eight years of this span of life were taken away from her because she complained of Abraham, blaming him as though he was the cause that Hagar no longer respected her. Sarah was sterile; but a miracle was granted to her after her name was changed from "Sarai" to "Sarah". According to one myth, when her fertility had been restored and she had given birth to Isaac, the people would not believe in the miracle, saying that the patriarch and his wife had adopted a foundling and pretended that it was their own son. Abraham thereupon invited all the notabilities to a banquet on the day when Isaac was to be weaned. Sarah invited the women, also, who brought their infants with them; and on this occasion she gave milk from her breasts to all the strange children, thus convincing the guests of the miracle.

Legends connect Sarah's death with the attempted sacrifice of Isaac, however, there are two versions of the story. According to one, Samael came to her and said: "Your old husband seized the boy and sacrificed him. The boy wailed and wept; but he could not escape from his father." Sarah began to cry bitterly, and ultimately died of her grief. According to the other legend, Satan came to Sarah disguised as an old man, and told her that Isaac had been sacrificed. Believing it to be true, she cried bitterly, but soon comforted herself with the thought that the sacrifice had been offered at the command of God. She started from Beer-sheba to Hebron, asking everyone she met if he knew in which direction Abraham had gone. Then Satan came again in human shape and told her that it was not true that Isaac had been sacrificed, but that he was living and would soon return with his father. Sarah, on hearing this, died of joy at Hebron. Abraham and Isaac returned to their home at Beer-sheba, and, not finding Sarah there, went to Hebron, where they discovered her dead. According to the Genesis Rabbah, during Sarah's lifetime her house was always hospitably open, the dough was miraculously increased, a light burned from Friday evening to Saturday evening, and a pillar of cloud rested upon the entrance to her tent.

=== In Christianity ===
Sarah has her feast day on 1 September in the Catholic Church, 19 August in the Coptic Orthodox Church, 20 January in the LCMS, and 12 and 20 December in the Eastern Orthodox Church.

=== In Islam ===
The Islamic portrayal of Sarah, who is unnamed in the Quran, mimics that of her portrayal in Judaism and Christianity, in that she is a good woman, kin and wife to Abraham, who, after years of barrenness, has a son, the prophet Isaac (Is'ḥāq). However, notable differences exist in the portrayal of her relationships with Abraham, Hagar, and Ishmael. She is not portrayed as Abraham's sister but his first cousin, said to be the daughter of Terah's brother, Haran, and Hagar is not portrayed as Abraham's mistress but a second wife, eliminating the hostility that Sarah feels for Hagar during her pregnancy and toward Ishmael.

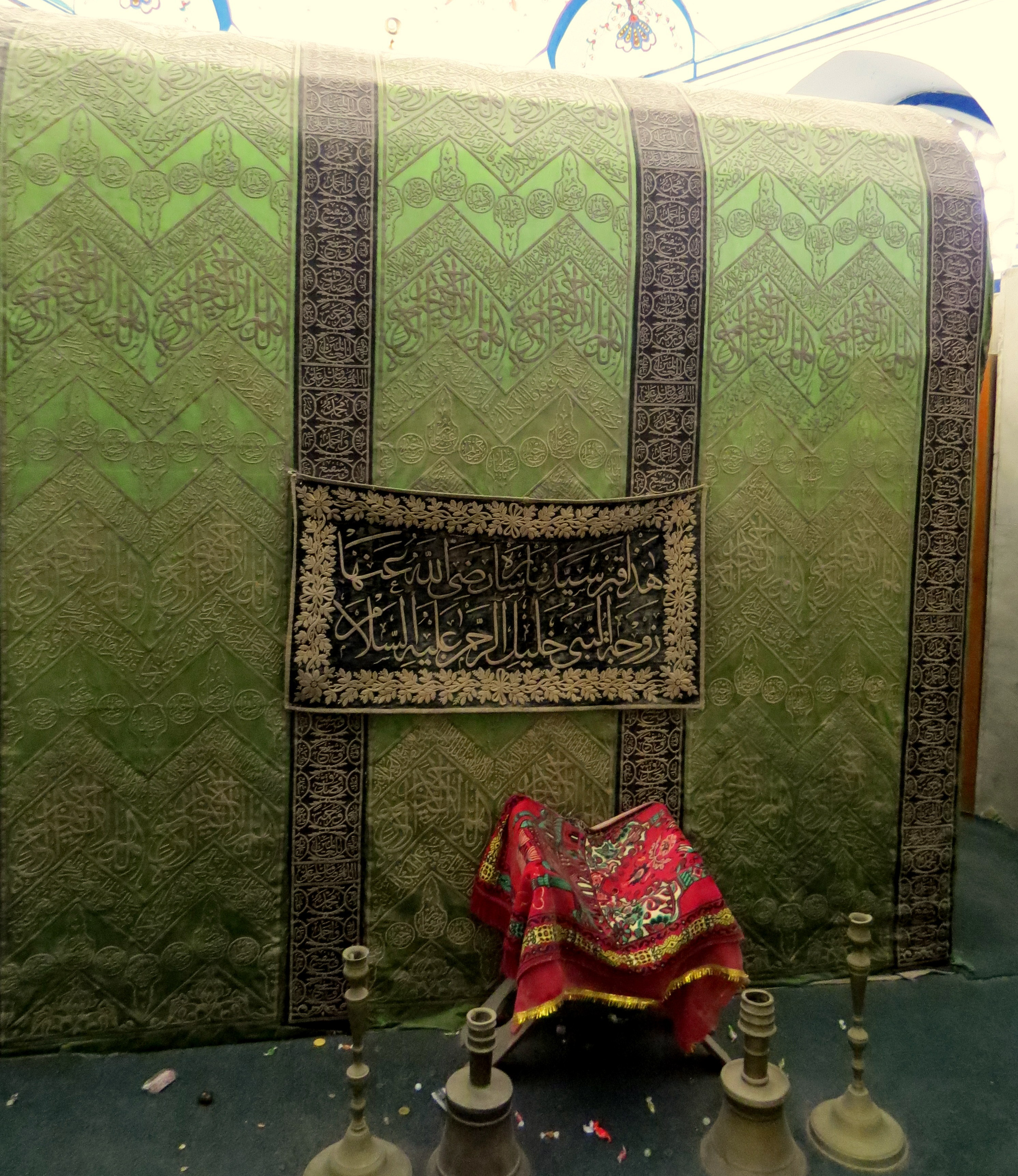
Mausoleum of Sarah, Abraham's wife in the Mosque of Abraham

The Quran likewise repeats the biblical story that Sarah laughed when she received a divine message confirming her pregnancy, although in the Quran this message is heralded by angels and not by God himself:

11:69 And surely Our messenger-angels came to Abraham with good news ˹of a son˺. They greeted ˹him with˺, “Peace!” And he replied, “Peace ˹be upon you˺!” Then it was not long before he brought ˹them˺ a ˹fat,˺ roasted calf.
11:70 And when he saw that their hands did not reach for the food, he became suspicious and fearful of them. They reassured ˹him˺, “Do not be afraid! We are ˹angels˺ sent ˹only˺ against the people of Lot.”
11:71 And his wife was standing by, so she laughed, then We gave her good news of ˹the birth of˺ Isaac, and, after him, Jacob.
11:72 She wondered, “Oh, my! How can I have a child in this old age, and my husband here is an old man? This is truly an astonishing thing!”

— Surah Hud 11:69-72

== Tomb of Sarah ==
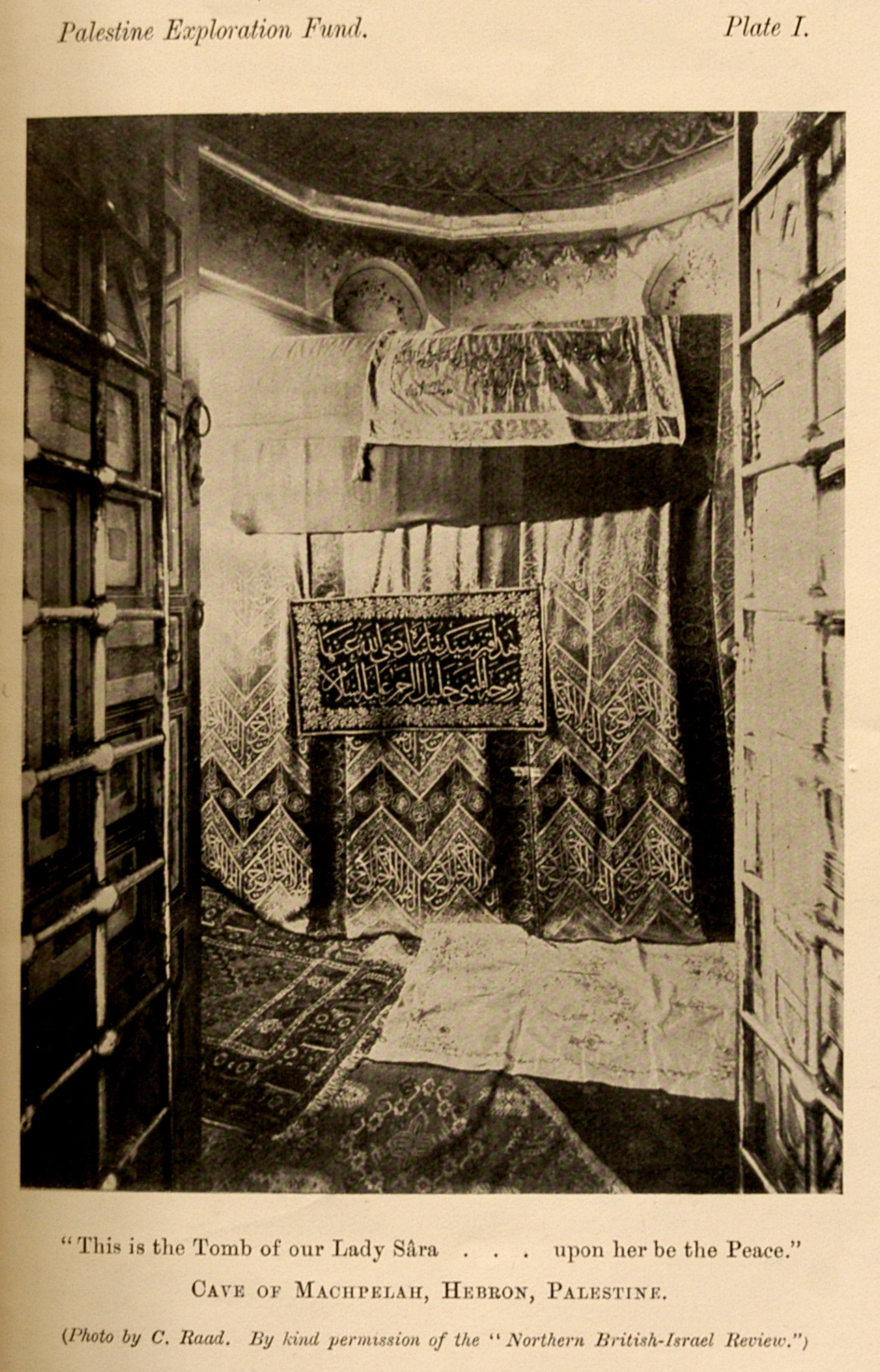
Mausoleum of Sarah, 1911.

Sarah is believed to be buried in the Cave of the Patriarchs (known by Muslims as the Sanctuary of Abraham). The compound, located in the ancient city of Hebron, is the second holiest site for Jews (after the Temple Mount in Jerusalem), and is also venerated by Christians and Muslims, both of whom have traditions which maintain that the site is the burial place of three biblical couples; Abraham and Sarah, Isaac and Rebecca, and Jacob and Leah.

== Relationship to Abraham ==
There are three stories in Genesis where a patriarch identifies his wife as his sister; scholars debate the relationship among these, with some saying that the account of the encounter of Abraham and Sarah with Pharaoh in Genesis 12-13 is the oldest, while the stories of Abraham and Sarah encountering King Abimelech in Genesis 20, and of Isaac and Rebecca's encounter with a different King Abimelech in Genesis 26, are interpretations of that one, generated to explain it or deal with other matters of concern. It is not clear which of the stories is actually older, or what the intent of the editors of the Bible may have been. Such unions were later explicitly banned in the Book of Leviticus (Leviticus 18:9). However, some commentators identify her as Iscah (Genesis 11:29), a daughter of Abraham's brother Haran, and point out that Abraham's claim that she was his half-sister was a lie to avoid saying that she was his wife.

According to Emanuel Feldman (1965), basing his argument on Albright's interpretation of the archaeology of Nuzu, a wife could legally be awarded the title "sister", and that this was the most sacred form of marriage, and hence Abraham and Isaac referred to their wives as "sisters" for this reason. Most archaeologists, however, dispute that view, instead arguing the opposite - that sisters in the region were often awarded the title "wife" in order to give them much greater status in society. Savina Teubal's book Sarah the Priestess posits that while Sarah was indeed both Abram's wife and sister, there was no incest taboo because she was a half-sister by a different mother.

== In popular culture ==
'Sarah' is also the title of one of Wales' best known hymns. Here are the first few opening bars, sung by the Pontarddulais Male Voice Choir.

Sarah has been featured in several novels, and she is the central character in Sarah by Orson Scott Card in the Women of Genesis series, Sarai: A Novel by Jill Eileen Smith (2012), and Sarah: A Novel by Marek Halter, and Song of Sarai by Zannah Martin. In the Christian fiction novel Redeeming Love by Francine Rivers, the protagonist, called "Angel" throughout the duration of the story, is barren. At the end of the book, she reveals that her birth name is "Sarah" to her husband, who takes the revelation as a promise from God that they will one day be able to have children. Sarah is also the focus of one of several stories collected in Sarah and After by Lynne Reid Banks. In the 1994 film Abraham, Sarah is portrayed by Barbara Hershey.

Sarah is also a subject discussed in nonfiction books. In Twelve Extraordinary Women by Pastor John F. MacArthur, her life and story is analyzed along with that of Eve, Rahab, Ruth, Hannah, the Virgin Mary, Anna the Prophetess, the Samaritan woman at the well, Mary of Bethany, Martha, Mary Magdalene, and Lydia of Thyatira. Sarah appears alongside several other biblical women in Slightly Bad Girls of the Bible: Flawed Women Loved by a Flawless God by Liz Curtis Higgs.

== See also ==
- Pregnancy over age 50
- Sarah (given name)
