= Masterson =

Masterson may refer to:

- Masterson, Texas, United States
- Masterson, the original name of Clinton, Vernon County, Wisconsin, United States
- Masterson (surname), including a list of people and fictional characters with the name

== See also ==
- Mastersonville, Pennsylvania, United States
