= Dr. Becky =

Dr. Becky may refer to:

- Becky Smethurst, British astrophysicist and YouTuber
- Rebecca Allison, American cardiologist and transgender activist
- Becky Kennedy, American clinical psychologist
