= Becky (disambiguation) =

Becky is a feminine given name, often a nickname for Rebecca. It may also refer to:

== Arts and entertainment ==
- Becky (1927 film), an American silent comedy film
- Becky (2020 film), an American action thriller film
- "Becky" (song), a 2009 song by rapper Plies

== Other uses ==
- Becky Falls, a waterfall in Dartmoor, England
- Becky (slang), slang for white woman
- Becky!, an email client
- Tropical Storm Becky (disambiguation)
- Becky's Diner, a diner in Portland, Maine

== See also ==
- Rebecca
