= Becca =

- Pronunciation: /ˈbɛkə/ BEK-ə
- Gender: Female

Origin
- Origin: Hebrew
- Meaning: "To Tie, To Bind"

Other names
- Related names: Rebecca, Becky, Beck, Rivkah, Rebeka.

Becca is a feminine given name, often a short form of Rebecca. Notable people with the name include:

== People ==
=== In arts and media ===
==== Music ====
- Beca (musician), American singer
- Becca (Ghanaian singer) (born 1984), Ghanaian Afropop singer, songwriter and actress Rebecca Akosua Acheampomaa Acheampong
- Becca (musician) (born 1989), American singer, songwriter, and guitarist Rebecca Hollcraft, lead singer of Stars In Stereo
- Becca Albee, American musician and visual artist
- Becca Barlow (born 1985), American rock guitarist and background singer
- Becca Bradley (born 1991), American Christian musician
- Becca Stevens (born 1984), American singer and guitarist
- Becca Tobin (born 1986), American actress, singer and dancer

==== Other media ====
- Becca Albee, American musician and visual artist
- Becca Bernstein (born 1977), American artist
- Becca Bloom, American social media influencer
- Becca Fitzpatrick (born 1979), American author
- Becca Kufrin (born 1990), American reality TV star
- Becca Tobin (born 1986), American actress, singer and dancer

=== In sport ===
- Becca Hamilton (born 1990), American curler
- Becca Longo (born 1999), American football kicker, first woman to earn a college football scholarship to an NCAA school at the Division II level or higher
- Becca Pizzi (born 1980), American marathon runner
- Becca Swanson (born 1973), American bodybuilder and powerlifter
- Rebecca Ward (born 1990), American sabre fencer

=== In other fields ===
- Becca Balint (born 1968), American educator, writer and politician
- Becca Stevens (priest) (born 1963), American Episcopal priest

== Fictional characters ==
- Becca Chang, in The Loud House and The Casagrandes
- Becca Fisher, on the Canadian TV series Flash Forward
- Becca Hayton, on the soap opera Hollyoaks
- Becca Swanson, on the British soap opera EastEnders

== Other uses ==
- Becca (film), a 1989 British-Australian television film
- Becca, in the Old English poem Widsith, the ruler of the Banings

== See also ==
- Beca (disambiguation)
