= Xuchang University =

Xuchang University (simplified Chinese: 许昌学院; traditional Chinese: 許昌學院; pinyin: Xǔchāng Xuéyuàn) is a university in Xuchang, Henan, China.

== History ==
The Xuchang Teachers' Learning House was established in 1907, and it became the Xuchang Teachers' School in 1911 and the Henan Provincial Xuchang Teachers' School during the Republican China era. Its name changed to Xuchang Teachers' School in 1958, and its name became the Secondary Teachers' School at a later period. The name changed to Xuchang Teachers' College again in 1978, and in 2002 it gained its current name after receiving approval to become a provincial university.
