= Xuchang =

Xuchang 许昌市 Hsuchang
- Prefecture-level city
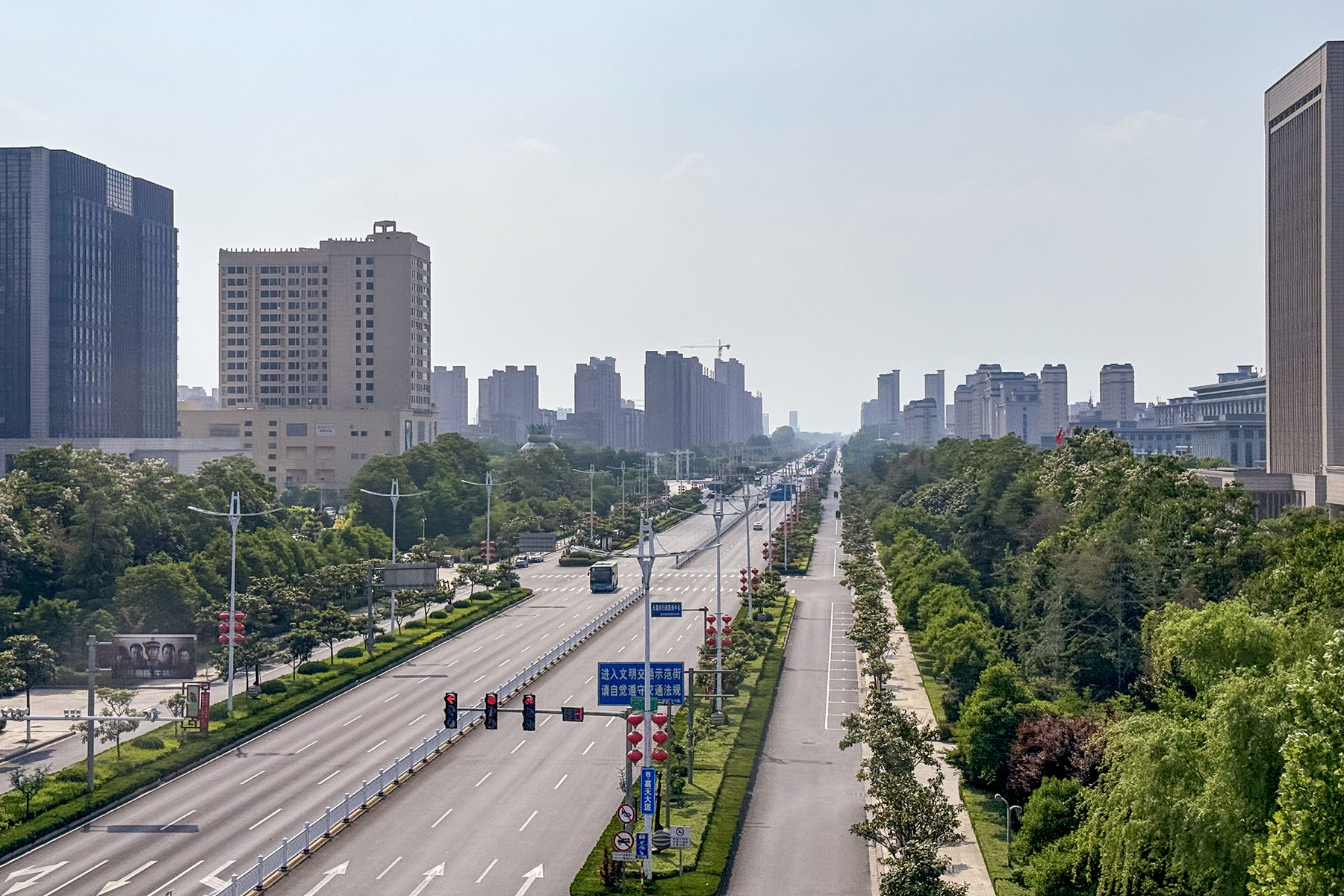
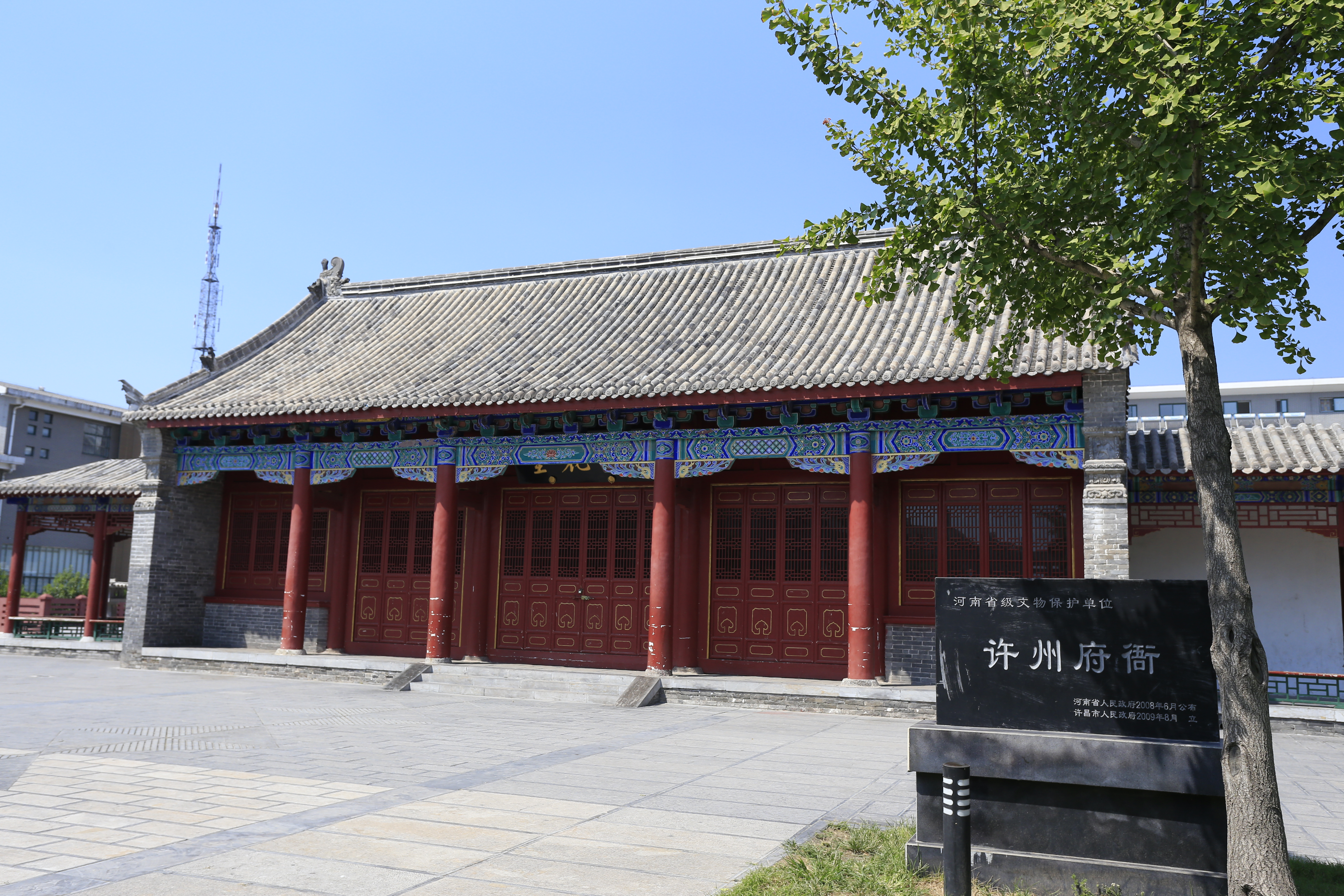
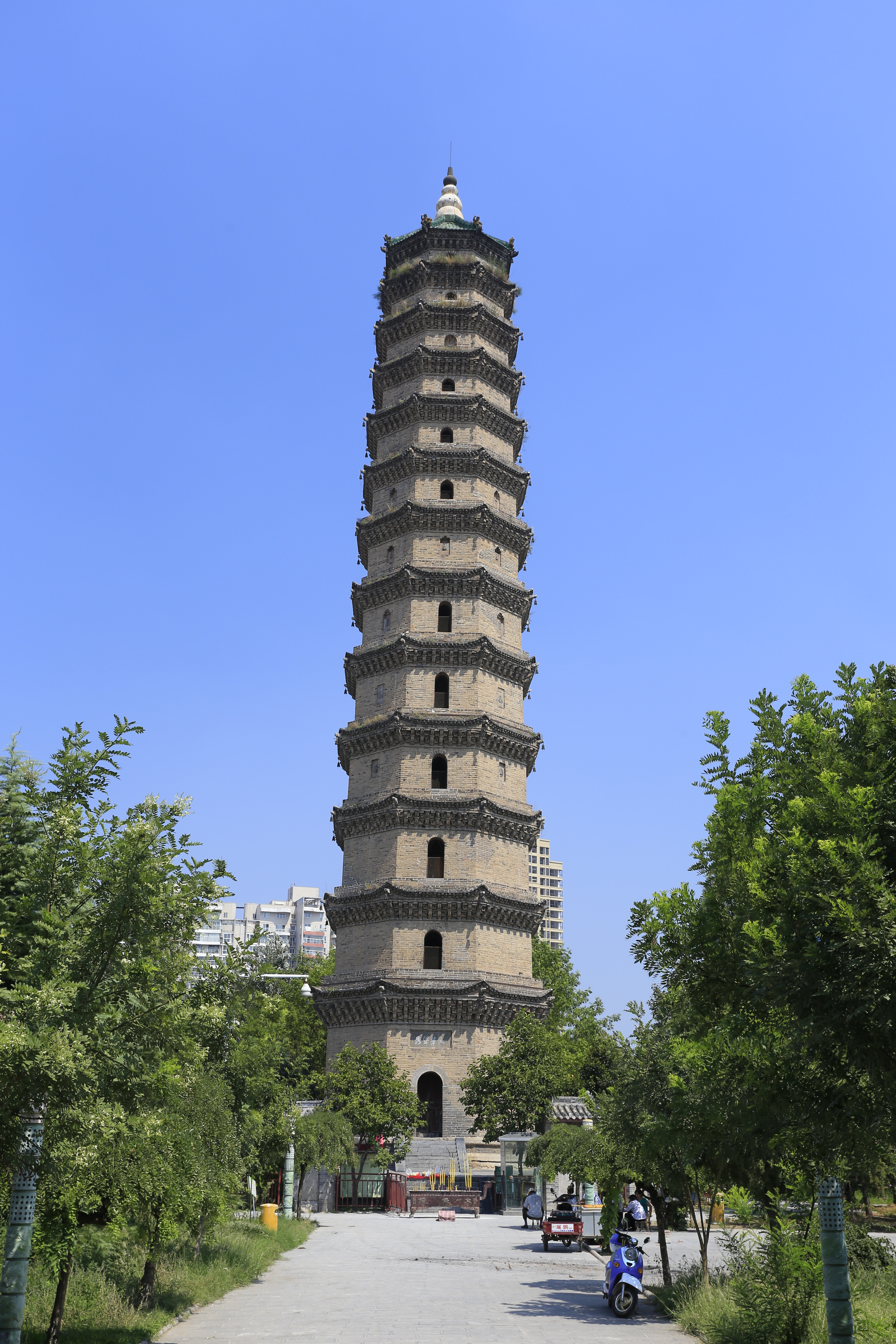
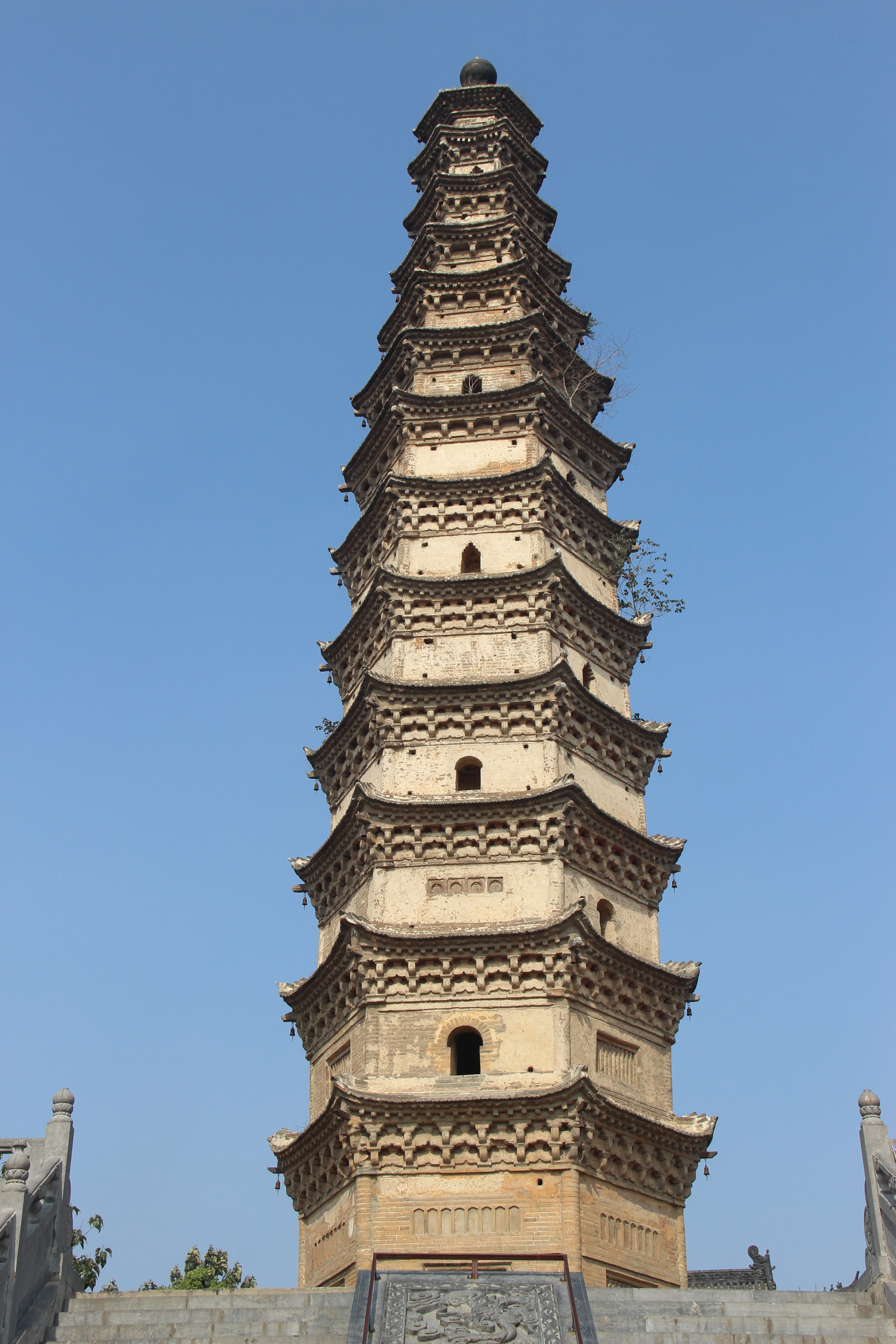
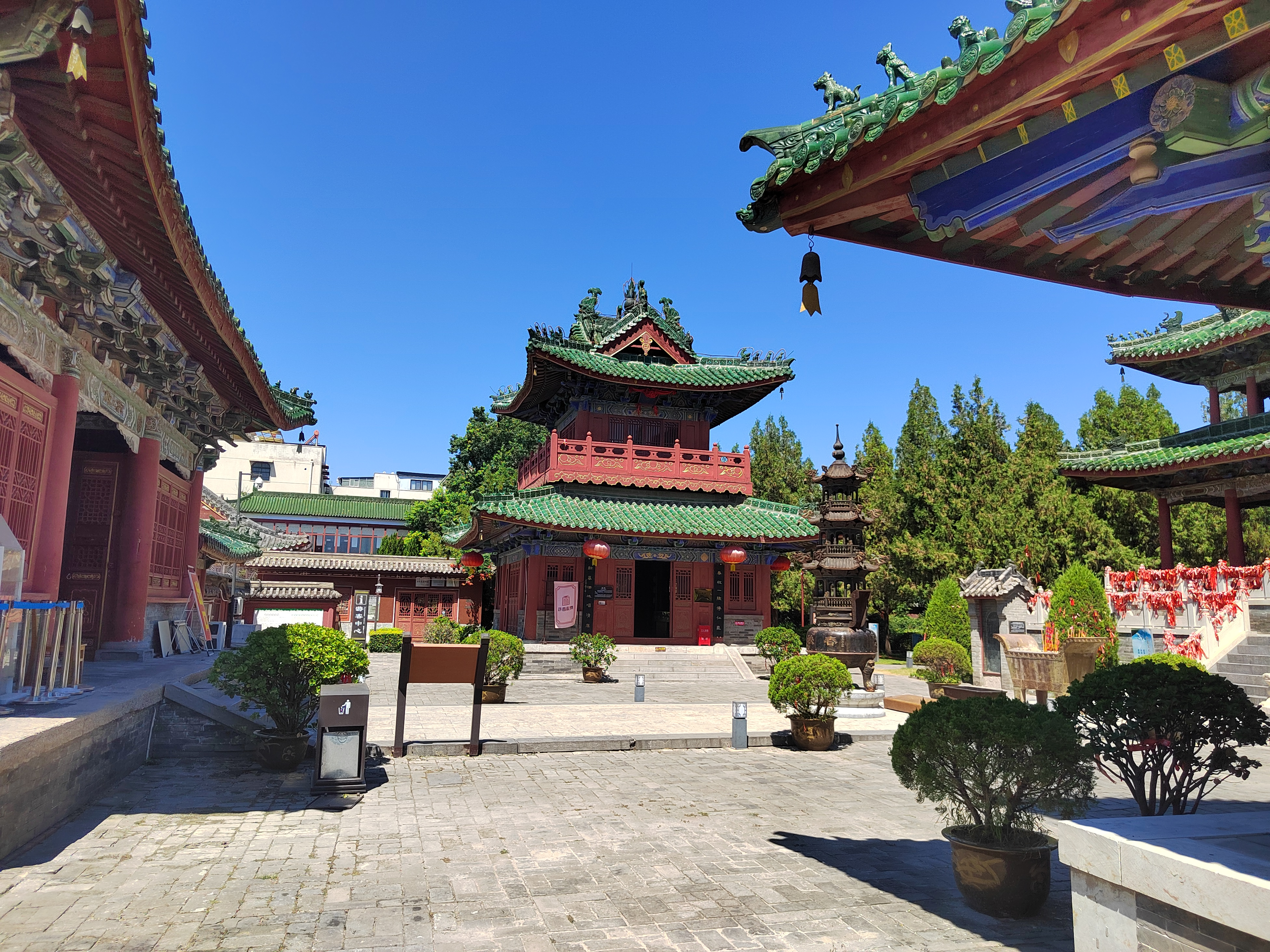
- Changge Xuzhou Yamen Wenfeng Pagoda Qianmingsi Pagoda Chunqiu Tower

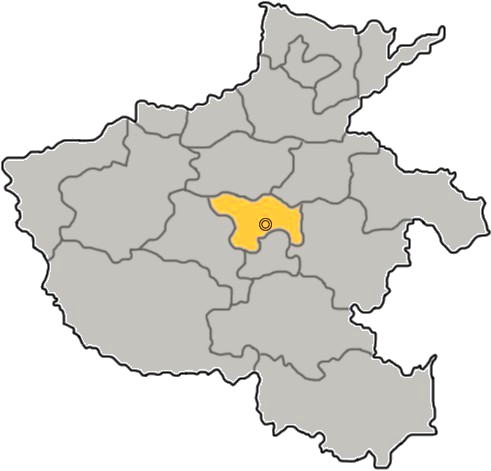
- Location of Xuchang City jurisdiction in Henan
- Coordinates (Xuchang municipal government): 34°02′13″N 113°51′07″E
- Country: People's Republic of China
- Province: Henan
- Municipal seat: Weidu District

Area
  - Prefecture-level city: 4,978.36 km^{2} (1,922.16 sq mi)
  - Urban: 1,088.2 km^{2} (420.2 sq mi)
  - Metro: 1,724 km^{2} (666 sq mi)
- Elevation: 71 m (233 ft)
- Highest elevation: 1,150.6 m (3,775 ft)
- Lowest elevation: 50.4 m (165 ft)

Population (2020 census for total, 2010 otherwise)
  - Prefecture-level city: 4,379,998
  - Density: 879.807/km^{2} (2,278.69/sq mi)
  - Urban: 1,265,536
  - Urban density: 1,163.0/km^{2} (3,012.1/sq mi)
  - Metro: 1,952,666
  - Metro density: 1,133/km^{2} (2,934/sq mi)

GDP
  - Prefecture-level city: CN¥ 237.8 billion US$ 35.8 billion
  - Per capita: CN¥ 54,522; US$ 8,208
- Time zone: UTC+8 (China Standard)
- Area code: 374
- ISO 3166 code: CN-HA-10
- Major Nationalities: Han
- County-level divisions: 6
- License plate prefixes: 豫K
- Website: xuchang.gov.cn

Xuchang
- Traditional Chinese: 許昌
- Simplified Chinese: 许昌
Transcriptions
Standard Mandarin
- Hanyu Pinyin: Xǔchāng
- Gwoyeu Romatzyh: Sheuchang
- Wade–Giles: Hsü^{3}-ch'ang^{1}
- IPA: [ɕỳʈʂʰáŋ]
Yue: Cantonese
- Yale Romanization: Héui-chēung
- Jyutping: Heoi^{2}-coeng^{1}
Southern Min
- Tâi-lô: Khóo-tshiong

Xuchang (simplified Chinese: 许昌; traditional Chinese: 許昌; postal: Hsuchang) is a prefecture-level city in central Henan province in Central China. It is bordered by the provincial capital of Zhengzhou to the northwest, Kaifeng to the northeast, Zhoukou to the east, Luohe to the southeast, and Pingdingshan to the southwest.

Its population was 4,307,488 inhabitants at the final 2010 census, of whom 1,952,666 lived in the built-up (or "metro") area made up of Weidu and Jian'an districts (named from Emperor Xian of Han's era name) and Changge City largely being urbanized. In 2007, the city was named as one of China's top ten livable cities by Chinese Cities Brand Value Report, which was released at 2007 Beijing Summit of China Cities Forum.

== Administration ==
The prefecture-level city of Xuchang administers two districts, two county-level cities and two counties.

- Weidu District (魏都区)
- Jian'an District (建安区)
- Yuzhou City (禹州市)
- Changge City (长葛市)
- Yanling County (鄢陵县)
- Xiangcheng County (襄城县)

Map
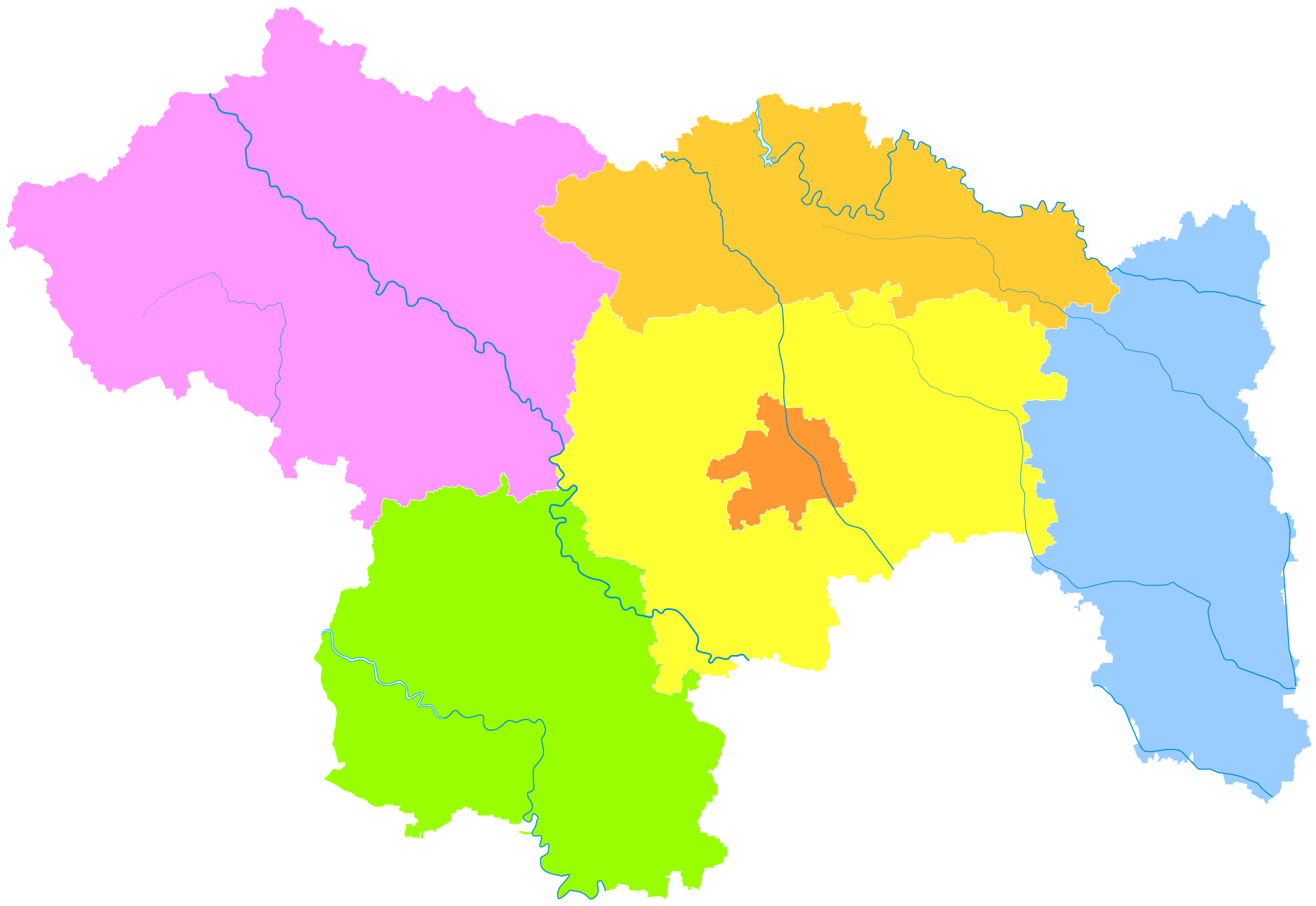

== History ==
During the early Zhou dynasty, the Xuchang region was granted to the Xu family (Xǔ (許/许)) of the Jiang surname and became the State of Xu, ruled by Xu Wenshu. During the Spring and Autumn and Warring States period, Xuchang was successively occupied by the states of Zheng and Chu, and the Xu family was later relocated to Ye County by the Chu state.

Xuchang served as the warlord Cao Cao's de facto capital during the late Eastern Han dynasty. After finding the old capital Luoyang ravaged by war, Cao moved the imperial court and Emperor Xian to what is now Xuchang in 196.

In 220, Cao Cao's son and successor Cao Pi officially declared the city as the capital of the newly established state of Cao Wei. The city was renamed "Xuchang" taken to mean "Xu Rising". The Wei emperors held court at Xuchang until the capital was moved to Luoyang in the 220s.

== Geography and climate ==
Xuchang ranges in latitude from 33° 16' to 34° 24' N and in longitude from 113° 03' to 114° 190' E.

Xuchang has a monsoon-influenced humid subtropical climate (Köppen Cwa), with four distinct seasons. Winters are cool and dry, summers hot and humid, spring begins early and is warm, and autumn is mild and provides a reasonable transition. Rain mainly falls from May to September, as more than 70% of the annual precipitation occurs then. The city has an annual mean temperature of at 14.6 °C (58.3 °F), and its highest average monthly temperature is 27.0 °C (80.6 °F) in July and the lowest is 0.7 °C (33.3 °F) in January. Just over 700 millimetres (28 in) of precipitation falls each year, the growing season averages 217 days and there is 2280 hours of sunshine per year.

Climate data for Xuchang, elevation 67 m (220 ft), (1991–2020 normals, extremes 1971-present)
Month	Jan	Feb	Mar	Apr	May	Jun	Jul	Aug	Sep	Oct	Nov	Dec	Year
Record high °C (°F)	20.2 (68.4)	23.5 (74.3)	28.3 (82.9)	34.2 (93.6)	39.3 (102.7)	42.1 (107.8)	40.4 (104.7)	38.9 (102.0)	37.2 (99.0)	35.1 (95.2)	27.7 (81.9)	21.4 (70.5)	42.1 (107.8)
Mean daily maximum °C (°F)	6.1 (43.0)	10.0 (50.0)	14.8 (58.6)	21.7 (71.1)	27.1 (80.8)	32.3 (90.1)	32.0 (89.6)	30.3 (86.5)	26.9 (80.4)	22.2 (72.0)	14.6 (58.3)	8.0 (46.4)	20.5 (68.9)
Daily mean °C (°F)	0.7 (33.3)	4.2 (39.6)	9.0 (48.2)	15.6 (60.1)	21.1 (70.0)	26.1 (79.0)	27.2 (81.0)	25.6 (78.1)	21.2 (70.2)	15.9 (60.6)	8.7 (47.7)	2.8 (37.0)	14.8 (58.7)
Mean daily minimum °C (°F)	−3.3 (26.1)	−0.4 (31.3)	4.1 (39.4)	10.0 (50.0)	15.6 (60.1)	20.6 (69.1)	23.4 (74.1)	22.1 (71.8)	17.0 (62.6)	11.1 (52.0)	4.0 (39.2)	−1.2 (29.8)	10.2 (50.5)
Record low °C (°F)	−16.4 (2.5)	−19.6 (−3.3)	−11.5 (11.3)	−2.9 (26.8)	3.2 (37.8)	11.6 (52.9)	16.4 (61.5)	11.7 (53.1)	6.3 (43.3)	−0.9 (30.4)	−13.1 (8.4)	−14.0 (6.8)	−19.6 (−3.3)
Average precipitation mm (inches)	12.4 (0.49)	14.4 (0.57)	27.3 (1.07)	40.9 (1.61)	65.0 (2.56)	86.5 (3.41)	167.4 (6.59)	123.6 (4.87)	80.9 (3.19)	44.0 (1.73)	32.6 (1.28)	11.5 (0.45)	706.5 (27.82)
Average precipitation days (≥ 0.1 mm)	4.3	4.9	5.9	6.1	7.7	7.9	11.5	10.6	8.9	6.6	6.0	4.0	84.4
Average snowy days	4.0	3.0	1.3	0.1	0	0	0	0	0	0	1.2	2.7	12.3
Average relative humidity (%)	65	65	65	68	67	65	79	83	78	70	70	65	70
Mean monthly sunshine hours	111.1	122.1	160.8	188.8	201.6	181.7	175.1	164.0	147.5	140.3	125.4	118.8	1,837.2
Percentage possible sunshine	35	39	43	48	47	42	40	40	40	40	41	39	41
Source 1: China Meteorological Administrationall-time extreme temperature
Source 2: Weather China

== Economy ==
Xuchang is an important center of the Chinese tobacco industry.

The manufacturing industry the city is best known for its wigs and hair extensions with exports worth about $1 billion in 2016. The industry started around 1900 when German merchants purchased hair from the local area. It was revived in the 1980s and in 1990 a local entrepreneur Zheng Youquan merged a number of smaller hair manufacturing workshops into Rebecca Hair Products, a larger entity that quickly expanded to international markets and became the largest wig maker in the world.

== Education ==
Xuchang University is in the city.

== Tourism ==
Famous tourist attractions include Baling Bridge and Chunqiu Tower.

== Sister city ==
On 18 December 2006, the Oromia Region government in Ethiopia signed an agreement with Henan Province to establish a sister city program with Ambo. Bolingbrook, Illinois is also a sister city of Xuchang.
