= Weidu, Xuchang =

Coordinates: 34.0167°N 113.817°E

Weidu 魏都区
- District
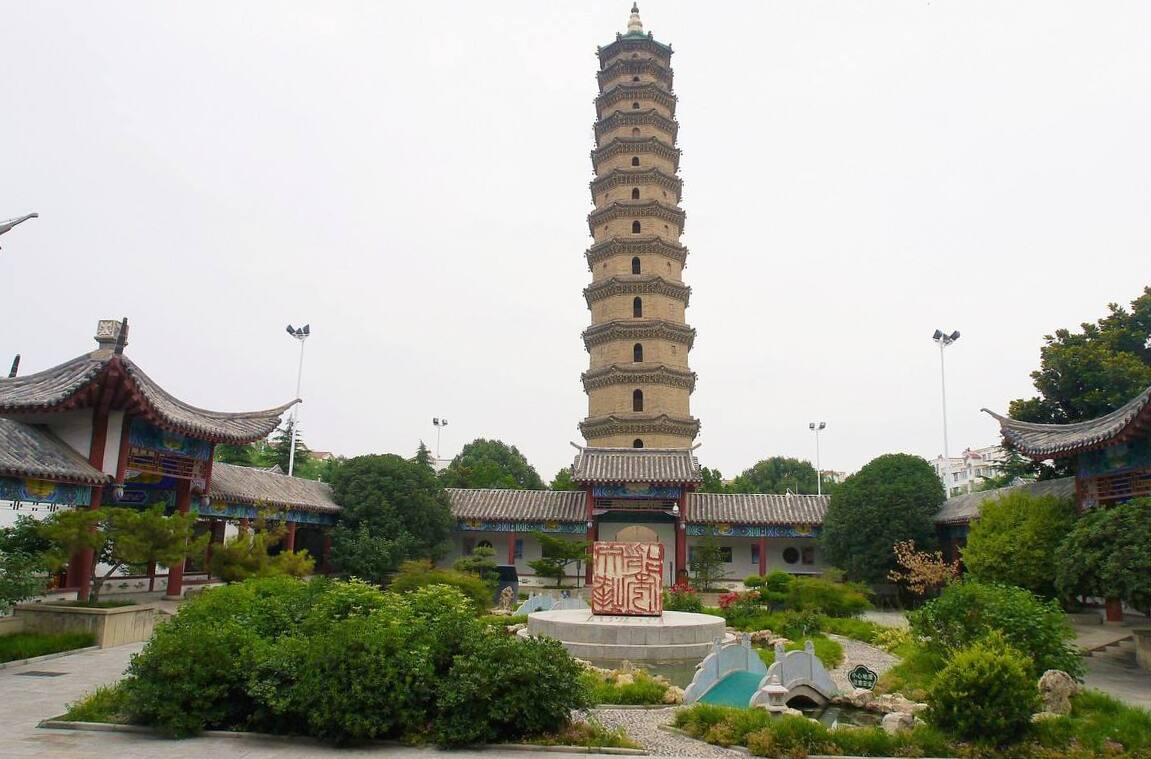
- Interactive map of Weidu
- Country: People's Republic of China
- Province: Henan
- Prefecture-level city: Xuchang

Area
  - Total: 67 km^{2} (26 sq mi)

Population (2019)
  - Total: 520,400
  - Density: 7,800/km^{2} (20,000/sq mi)
- Time zone: UTC+8 (China Standard)
- Postal code: 461000

Weidu (Chinese: 魏都; pinyin: Wèidū; lit. 'Wei capital') is a district of the city of Xuchang, Henan province, China, named for Xuchang having been the capital of the Cao Wei (曹魏) state during the Three Kingdoms period (220-280 AD).

== Administrative divisions ==
As of 2012, this county is divided to 12 subdistricts.

Subdistricts

- Xidajie Subdistrict (西大街街道)
- Dongdajie Subdistrict (东大街街道)
- Xiguan Subdistrict (西关街道)
- Nanguan Subdistrict (南关街道)
- Beidajie Subdistrict (北大街街道)
- Wuyilu Subdistrict (五一路街道)
- Gaoqiaoying Subdistrict (高桥营街道)
- Dingzhuang Subdistrict (丁庄街道)
- Bandaihe Subdistrict (半截河街道)
- Qilidian Subdistrict (七里店街道)
- Wenfeng Subdistrict (文峰街道)
- Xinxing Subdistrict (新兴街道)
