= Jana Harris =

American poet

Jana Harris (born September 21, 1947) is an American poet, novelist, and essayist and the founder of one of the internet's first electronic poetry journals.

== Biography ==
Harris was born in San Francisco, California. She attended the University of Oregon (B.S., 1969) and San Francisco State University (M.A., 1972). She has taught creative writing at New York University (1980) and, since 1986, at the University of Washington.

She is the founder and editor of Switched-on Gutenberg, one of the internet's earliest electronic poetry journals. Its first issue was in June 1995 and included work by Galway Kinnell, Joyce Carol Oates, and others.

Several of her volumes of poetry concern the lives of American pioneers and settlers. The Dust of Everyday Life: An Epic Poem of the Pacific Northwest, which won the 1998 Andres Berger Award, looks at the lives of pioneers in the Pacific Northwest. Two other poem collections, Oh How Can I Keep on Singing: Voices of Pioneer Women (1993) and You Haven't Asked About My Wedding or What I Wore: Poems of Courtship on the American Frontier (2014), are based on the diaries, reminiscences, and stories of American pioneer women of the 19th century such as Martha Gay Masterson and Catherine Sager Pringle. One critic termed Oh How Can I Keep on Singing "vivid, authentic, and moving", while another wrote that Harris has "rescued from virtual oblivion the voices of these women, who have much to tell us about ourselves and our own world."

Harris's poetry has been frequently anthologized, and among the awards she has won are the prestigious Pushcart Prize for poetry (2001) and the Andres Berger Award. She has been a finalist for the PEN West Center Award and has won the Washington State Governor’s Writers Award. Two of her books—Manhattan as a Second Language and Other Poems (1982) and Oh How Can I Keep on Singing: Voices of Pioneer Women (1993).

Writer Lynn Middleton has based a play, Fair Sex, on Harris's poetry.

Harris's nonfiction book, Horses Never Lie about Love: The Heartwarming Story of a Remarkable Horse Who Changed the World Around Her, is an account of her experiences with a horse physically and psychically damaged in a fire. Fellow poet Maxine Kumin observed that it was "incisive, eloquent, sometimes lyrical, sometimes comic".

== Personal life ==
She lives in the Cascade Mountains and raises horses with her husband, Mark Allen Bothwell.

== Publications ==
=== Poems ===
- This House Rocks with Every Truck on the Road (1976)
- Pin Money: Poems (1977)
- The Clackamas (1980)
- Who's That Pushy Bitch? (1978)
- Running Scared (1981)
- Manhattan As a Second Language and Other Poems (1982)
- The Sourlands: Poems (1989)
- Oh How Can I Keep on Singing: Voices of Pioneer Women (1993; finalist for the PEN West Center Award)
- The Dust of Everyday Life: An Epic Poem of the Pacific Northwest (1998, Andres Berger Award)
- We Never Speak of It: Idaho-Wyoming Poems, 1889-90 (2003; nominated for the Kingsley Tufts Poetry Award)
- You Haven't Asked About My Wedding or What I Wore: Poems of Courtship on the American Frontier (2014)

=== Novels ===
- Alaska (1980)
- The Pearl of Ruby City: A Mystery (1998)

=== Nonfiction ===
- Horses Never Lie About Love: The Heartwarming Story of a Remarkable Horse Who Changed the World Around Her (2011)
