= Becki =

- Gender: Female

Origin
- Origin: Hebrew

Other names
- Related names: Rebecca, Becky, Beck, Rivkah

Becki is a feminine given name. It is a pet form of Rebecca. Becki may refer to:

- Becki Newton, American actress
- Becki Pipette, English singer

== See also ==
- Becky (disambiguation)
- Beki
- Litoria becki
