= Sarah (Card novel) =

2000 novel by Orson Scott Card

Sarah: Women of Genesis
- Author: Orson Scott Card
- Cover artist: Frederic Leighton
- Language: English
- Series: Women of Genesis
- Genre: Historical
- Publisher: Bookcraft
- Publication date: September, 2000
- Publication place: United States
- Media type: Print (Hardcover & Paperback)
- Pages: 400 pp
- ISBN: 978-1-57008-994-7
- Followed by: Rebekah

Sarah: Women of Genesis (2000) is the first novel in the Women of Genesis series by Orson Scott Card.

== Plot introduction ==
Sarah follows the story of Abraham through the eyes and perspective of Sarah. The Biblical account of the life of Sarah is contained in Genesis 12 - 22 (about 16 pages) most of which is centered on Abraham. Card expands the story into a novel of over 300 pages, so many of the details and characters are fictional. He also seems to use the Book of Abraham, a section of the LDS Standard Works. The core story-line does not deviate from the story told in Genesis and the Book of Abraham, although some of the details are reinterpreted.

Sarah begins life as a princess of Ur in Mesopotamia. She is hard-working and humble especially compared to her older sister Qira. Sarai is promised to become a priestess for the goddess Asherah, while Qira is to marry a desert prince named Lot. Sarai's thoughts on a life as a priestess change when Lot arrives with his uncle Abram who promises Sarai that he'll come back and marry her.

== See also ==
- List of works by Orson Scott Card
- Orson Scott Card
