= Rivka (given name) =

Rivka or Rivkah is a form of the given name Rebecca. Notable people whose official name is Rivka or Rivkah or otherwise commonly known by the name "Rivka" of "Rivkah" include:

- Rivka Basman Ben-Hayim
- Rivka Bayech
- Rivka Bertisch Meir
- Rivka Carmi
- Rivka Galchen
- Rivka Golani
- Rivka Guber
- Rivka Keren
- Rivka Michaeli
- Rivka Neumann
- Rivka Oxman
- Rivka Ravitz
- Rivka Saker
- Rivka Schatz Uffenheimer
- Rivka Sturman
- Rivka Weinberg
- Rivka Yahav
- Rivka Zohar
- Rivkah (artist) (born 1981), American comic book artist and writer

== See also ==
- Rebecca (biblical figure), biblical figure
- Rebecca
