= Rachel and Leah =

2004 novel by Orson Scott Card

- Author: Orson Scott Card
- Cover artist: Frederic Leighton
- Language: English
- Series: Women of Genesis
- Genre: Historical novel
- Publisher: Forge Books (Tor)
- Publication date: 2004
- Publication place: United States
- Media type: Print (Hardcover & Paperback)
- Pages: 368 pp
- Preceded by: Rebekah
- Followed by: The Wives of Israel

Rachel and Leah (2004) is the third novel in the Women of Genesis series by Orson Scott Card.

== Plot introduction ==
Rachel and Leah follows the story of Jacob through the eyes of Rachel and Leah. Card expands the story into a novel of over 300 pages, so many of the details and characters are fictional. However, the storyline does not deviate from the story told in Genesis.

== See also ==
- List of works by Orson Scott Card
- Orson Scott Card
