= Reba =

Reba may refer to:

- Reba McEntire, an American country musician and actress
  - Reba (TV series), a sitcom featuring her
  - Reba (album), one of her albums
  - Reba: Duets, another one of her albums
- Reba (Midianite king), in the Hebrew Bible
- Reba Rambo, a Christian music singer and songwriter
- Reba Buhr, american voice actress
- Reba, the mail lady from Pee Wee's Playhouse
- "Reba", a song by Phish
- Reba, a product line of cross-country mountainbike suspension forks made by RockShox
- Reba, a cyprinid fish, either Cirrhinus reba or Gymnostomus ariza
- Reba Sabrina Hinojos, birth name of "Cheetah Girl" Sabrina Bryan
- Reba Byrd Masterson, Texas geologist
