= Rebeca Silva Cosío =

Mexican singer (1925–2002)

- Born: María Marcelina Rebeca Silva Cosío; 26 April 1925; Mexico City, Mexico
- Died: 7 May 2002 (aged 77) Jalisco, Mexico
- Occupation: Singer
- Years active: 1960s–1970s
- Label: RCA Victor
- Formerly of: Agustín Lara

María Marcelina Rebeca Silva Cosío (26 April 1925, Mexico City – 7 May 2002, Jalisco), known as Rebeca Silva Cosío or simply Rebeca, was a Mexican singer who was the last official vocalist of the renowned Mexican songwriter and pianist Agustín Lara. She also introduced and recorded Lara's final songs.

She recorded her first album, Señora tentación, in 1959 and won a gold record in 1961. She was an RCA Victor exclusive artist and her records were best sellers in Mexico in the 1960s.

== Discography ==
- Señora tentación: Rebeca interpreta a Agustín Lara (RCA Victor, 1959)
- Canciones de Agustín Lara (RCA Victor, 1961)
- Vol. III (RCA Victor, 1961)
- Enamorada (RCA Victor, 1962)
- Vol. V (RCA of Mexico, 1962; generally the same as Canciones inolvidables, RCA Victor, Spain, 1963)
- Y La Inspiración De Agustín Lara (RCA Victor, 1962)
- Nacida para amar... (RCA Victor, 1966) – with Agustín Lara and the orchestra of Chucho Ferrer
- El disco de oro de Rebeca (Discos XEW, 1973)
