= Beca (artist group) =

Beca was a group of artists formed in the 1970s in Wales. The group was formed by Welsh artist Paul Davies (1947-93) and brought a new national consciousness to late 20th-century art in Wales.

Although Beca's importance in Welsh art is still widely unrecognised, it was the instigating movement in the politicalization of art in the country. The group took international trends and methodologies in art and applied them to a Welsh context. The group's artists drew on a diverse range of sources including Arte Povera, Fluxus and Surrealism.

The group continued into the 21st century, led by Davies' brother Peter; and together with the likes of artists Ivor Davies, Iwan Bala, Peter Finnemore and Tim Davies the group found respectability under post-modern reassessments. The group used a mixture of artistic expression, including installation, painting, sculpture and performance, engaging with language, environmental and land rights issues.

== Bibliography ==
- Davies, John; Jenkins, Nigel (2008). The Welsh Academy Encyclopaedia of Wales. Cardiff: University of Wales Press. ISBN 978-0-7083-1953-6.
