= Becky Edwards =

Rebecca or Becky Edwards may refer to:

- Becky Edwards (Utah politician), American politician
- Becky Edwards (Montana politician), American politician
- Becky Edwards (soccer) (born 1988), American soccer player
- Rebecca Edwards (rower) (born 1993), 2020 British Olympian
- Becca Edwards, Ex on the Beach series 6 participant
