= Rebecca Hair Products =

Chinese manufacturer of hair products

Henan Rebecca Hair Products Co. Ltd.
- Company type: Public
- Industry: Hair products
- Founded: 1995
- Headquarters: Xuchang, Henan, China
- Revenue: Approx. $200 million (2016)
- Number of employees: 11,000

Henan Rebecca Hair Products (SSE: 600439) is a Chinese manufacturer of hair products. It is the largest producer of hair products in the world.

== History ==
The company was founded in 1995. It launched an overseas presence in 1999 by opening in Nigeria. In 2003, it became the first hair products company listed on the Shanghai Stock Exchange.

== Consumer markets ==
The company operates in China but almost all of its products are sold in export markets. Rebecca Hair operates in the US, Europe, and over 20 countries in Africa. The African market is particularly important for the company and accounts for about half of the company's overall revenue; in 2017 African revenue reached 884 million yuan (138.1 million U.S. dollars). Nigeria is the focal point of African operations but there are smaller subsidiaries in Ghana, Togo, Côte d'Ivoire, Burkina Faso, the Democratic Republic of the Congo, Tanzania, and Kenya.

== Manufacturing ==
The company has factories in China, Nigeria and Ghana. Manufacturing of synthetic hair products requiring use of machinery with constant power supply is located in China.
