= Becky Southworth =

TV presenter / journalist

Becky Southworth is a British director, journalist and television presenter.

In 2017, Southworth won a Royal Television Society award for her debut documentary Kicked Out: From Care To Chaos.

Her second documentary Can Sex Offenders Change? was released in 2020. Lucy Magnan of The Guardian rated the documentary 4/5. It was shortlisted for a 2021 Grierson Award.

Becky was nominated 2025 for a BAFTA for the ITV documentary Maternity: Broken Trust which she produced.

In 2022 she was named as one of Big Issue Changemakers 2022 for her work in filmmaking.

Southworth is also known for her work on other documentaries, such as Gambling: A Game of Life and Death(2022) which won an RTS award in 2023, as well as being nominated in the same year for the BBCTWO film she produced; The Mormons are Coming (2022)

More recentlyBecky was applauded for directing Belmarsh: Serial Killers & High Security(2024)

In 2019 she began narrating BBC TAGGED series, which follows life of young people on electronic tag in the UK.
