= Becky Yee =

American portrait photographer (born 1969)

- Born: July 4, 1969 (age 56); New York, New York, U.S.
- Education: SUNY Buffalo; Samuel Curtis Johnson Graduate School of Management
- Known for: Photography

Becky Yee (born July 4, 1969) is an American portrait photographer and the founder of Around Digital Media.

== Becky Yee Photography ==
Upon moving back to New York in 2008, Yee has been busy with exhibitions and also reestablishing herself as a versatile photographer in her editorial, commercial and curated work. Her work was displayed at the 2008 Media Facades Festival in Berlin, Germany. One of her first exhibitions was "More Than A Woman" at HPGRP Gallery. This was a controversial exhibition that chronicles a man in Tokyo, who proclaims to be the world's largest collector of "Dutch Wives" (Datchu-waifu) with over 70 anatomically correct, life-sized sex dolls. Yee continues to develop projects and exhibitions that utilize photography, video, music and other media to create unique images that show the provocative and vulnerable side of her subjects and topics.

== Select Exhibitions/Projects ==
- 2011-Back to the Streets—書店外里帰り - Sakura Matsuri, Solo Photography Exhibition, Brooklyn Botanical Garden, Brooklyn, NY, USA
- "Back to the Streets” at the Nakaochiai Gallery
- More Than a Woman, Solo Photography Exhibition, HPGRP Gallery – Meatpacking District, New York, NY, USA,

== Books/Publications/Periodicals ==
- 2009 More Than A Woman - HPGRP Gallery Publishing, USA
- 2005 Xtreme Fashions - Prestel Books, Munich, Berlin, London, New York
- Schmuck Quickies - Middlesbrough Institute of Modern Art Publications, Great Britain
- 2003 Yuka Oyama Tokamachi Catalogue - Tokamachi Publication, Japan
- 2002 Yoichi Nagasawa Retrospective - Tankosha Publishing, Japan

== Awards ==
- 2009 Critics Picks, ArtForum, New York, “More Than A Woman” solo exhibition
- 2009 Best in Show, Village Voice, “More Than A Woman” solo exhibition
- 2009 Voice Choices, “Village Voice, More Than A Woman” solo exhibition
- 2008 International Photography Cup – Nudes, Red Box Project, London, England
- 2005 PDN Photo Annual, Photo Products Design, Prohibit Men's Fashion Catalog, New York, NY
