= Martha Gay Masterson =

Martha Gay Masterson (November 8, 1837 – December 12, 1916) was an American settler who kept a diary throughout her life, beginning with her family's journey west on the Oregon Trail when she was just 13. First published three-quarters of a century after her death, it offers a firsthand view of life for girls and women in the Pacific Northwest during the second half of the 19th century.

== Biography ==
Martha Ann "Mattie" Gay was born in 1837, the sixth of 12 children of Johan "Ann" Stewart (Evans) Gay and Martin Baker Gay, a farmer. Her father moved the family around several southern states before, in 1851, deciding to emigrate from Springfield, Missouri, to Oregon along the Oregon Trail. The crossing took five months, and the family eventually settled in Lane County, Oregon. During the trip, Martha kept a diary of the family's trials and adventures, and she continued keeping this diary afterwards, right up until her death.

In 1871, she married widower James Alfred Masterson. They had three children together, two of whom died young. The couple moved around a good deal and separated after twenty years, and Martha spent her later years with her only surviving child, her daughter Frances.

Masterson died in Eugene, Oregon, at the end of 1916.

== Publications and legacy ==
In 1990, historian Lois Barton published Masterson's diary-cum-reminiscences with explanatory notes under the title One Woman's West: Recollections of the Oregon Trail and Settling of the Northwest Country. This passage gives a sense of her style and subject matter:

If there were any graves near camp we would visit them and read the inscriptions. Sometimes we would see where wolves had dug into the graves after the dead bodies, and we saw long braids of golden hair telling of some young girl's burying place.

In 1995, writer Rebecca Stetoff based a nonfiction book for young readers, Children of the Westward Trail, on Masterson's diary. Illustrated with period photographs and drawings, it has been used as reading for Oregon schoolchildren in courses about the settlement of the American West and Oregon history.

In 2014, poet Jana Harris published You Haven't Asked About My Wedding or What I Wore, a book of poems based on writings by American pioneer women. One of her poems, "The Stove", was based on Masterson's diary and includes these lines:

If we found graves, we'd read their inscriptions.
If wolves had broken in
we'd look for the ropey yellow braids
of young girls like ourselves.
