= List of storms named Becky =

The name Becky has been used for nine tropical cyclones worldwide: five in the Atlantic Ocean, two in the West Pacific Ocean, one in the Australian region, and one in the South Pacific Ocean.

In the Atlantic:

- Tropical Storm Becky (1958) – no landfall
- Tropical Storm Becky (1962) – brought about 30 hours of rainfall on the Cape Verde islands
- Hurricane Becky (1966) – no landfall
- Tropical Storm Becky (1970) – landfall on the Florida Panhandle
- Hurricane Becky (1974) – formed southwest of Bermuda, no landfall

In the West Pacific:

- Typhoon Becky (1990) (16W, Iliang) – hit northern Luzon as a strong tropical storm; strengthened over the South China Sea and hit northern Vietnam as a Category 1-equivalent typhoon
- Tropical Storm Becky (1993) (22W, Yeyeng) – brushed the northern end of Luzon; landfall in China

In the Australian region:

- Cyclone Becky (1968)

In the South Pacific:

- Tropical Cyclone Becky (2007) (13F, 21P) – threatened Vanuatu but did not make landfall

== See also ==
- Cyclone Bheki (2024) – a South-West Indian Ocean tropical cyclone with a similar name
