= Becky Bios =

Mexican activist, biologist, teacher

Becky Bios is the pseudonym of a Mexican activist, biologist and teacher. She survived attempted murder by her then-partner and is now known as the creator of an inexpensive, homemade forensic kit that can help identify a victim who has gone missing. After surviving her own attack, she changed her identity and assumed the pseudonym Becky Bios for her own protection.

== Attempted murder ==
On 8 June 2015, she was the victim of an attempted femicide at the hands of her then-partner, a systems engineer, who severely beat her when she packed her bags to leave him after experiencing domestic and sexual violence. She woke up from two weeks in a coma, hospitalized and connected to an endotracheal tube that allowed her to breathe. From that moment on, she assumed a new name, Becky Bios. She had to undergo rehabilitation therapy for a year to be able to walk again and the after-effects of the attack still cause her to limp, forget words and suffer from anxiety.

Despite the injuries he had caused, a collapsed lung, a ruptured gallbladder, hearing loss and respiratory arrest, her attacker, a boxer, threatened her in the hospital room and sent her intimidating messages on social media.

== Activism ==
When Becky tried to file a complaint two months after the attack, authorities denied her that opportunity, saying "Time has passed, and besides, the wounds have already healed." Her story, along with the negligence of authorities, transformed her into an activist to support other victims and families of women who have been abused, raped or murdered.

She tried to file a legal complaint against the partner but she was denied that opportunity because the statute of limitations had expired while she was in rehabilitation and learning to walk again, eat on her own and speak properly. In 2016, she posted a photograph of her attacker online because she felt ignored by the authorities. The partner has remained free.

Every year, during the Day of the Dead celebrations in Mexico City, Bios leads the March of the Catrinas (where dozens of participants paint their faces as if they were dead) and walks from Paseo de la Reforma to the Antimonumenta in front of the Palacio de Bellas Artes. She is a co-organizer of this march in which a contingent of activists, victims and relatives of murdered or disappeared women participate in protest. She has also attended demonstrations in San Salvador Atenco.

As a teacher, she gives talks to students about violence, some of which have spread to social media, including YouTube. She has created and manages social media profiles dedicated to offering advice to other women who have been victims of violence. She has also managed to identify at least three femicides using information obtained from social media.

== Forensic kit ==
The identity kit that Bios developed can be made inexpensively at home proactively by anyone, stored safely away, and then used by investigators or families to positively establish the identity of the missing person or to identify recovered remains. Bios created the kit as part of her undergraduate thesis in molecular biology and her master's degree in Forensic Sciences at the National Autonomous University of Mexico (UNAM).

The kit allows anyone to collect both nuclear DNA and mitochondrial DNA. A typical kit contains a person's fingerprints, a lock of hair, fingernails, toenails, photos (updated every 6 months), tattoo information, a missing person search form (downloadable from the internet), an item of clothing that has covered the upper part of the body (worn for a full day) and a dental image showing all teeth and their positions.

The forensic kit has both supporters and detractors who accuse Bios of normalizing the humanitarian crisis of missing people in Mexico. Some search groups object to the identity kit because they say that having personal forensic kits could mean that the Mexican government continues to avoid its responsibilities. They also say it promotes fear among Mexicans of becoming a missing person.

Bios has said: "The forensic kit was designed as a preventive and precautionary tool in case someone close to us were to disappear. This ensures that we have information on hand and can be compared against the databases of the National Search Commission, the Prosecutor's Office, or any other law enforcement agency that may be able to assist in the search."

The genetic collection method used in the kit is monitored and supervised by UNAM professors.
