= Beca (musician) =

American singer

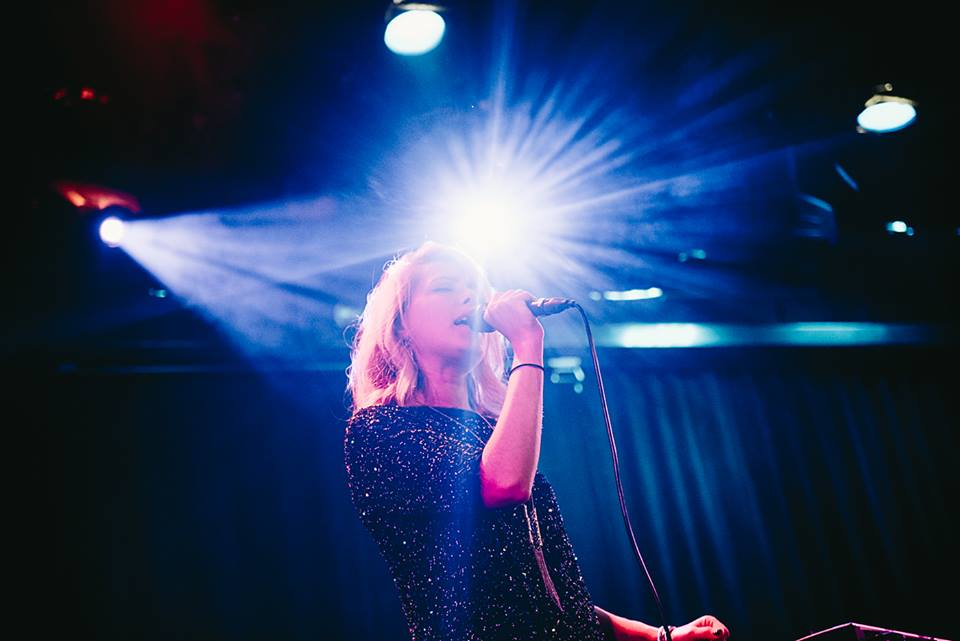
- Beca performing in 2015

Background information
- Origin: New York, U.S.
- Years active: 2012–present
- Label: This Is Music Ltd.
- Website: becadreams.com

Rebecca B. Schack, known by her stage name Beca (also Beca Dreams) is an American singer, songwriter, and producer from New York.

== Early life ==
Beca grew up in Upstate New York. In her youth she played the piano, sang, and studied many genres of music including jazz and classical.

At age 18 she moved to Manhattan to study music composition at Juilliard with composers Samuel Adler, Christopher Rouse, and Elliott Sharp.

She found herself drawn to the club scene and started playing with various indie bands.

== Music career ==
Her two first EPs Let's Run Wild and Born to Fly were released via UK label This Is Music Ltd in 2012. The songs on Let's Run Wild were co-written and co-produced by Findlay Brown.

Her debut album, Ecliptic, was independently released in 2015. The album accrued radio spins from over 50 stations nationwide including Los Angeles' KCRW. Her song "Meteor" charted on Beatport's Top 100 Indie Dance Releases and debuted in the Top 90 of the FMQB (Friday Morning Quarterback) Singles Chart. Beca's single "The Secrets That We Keep" was a finalist in the 2019 John Lennon Songwriting Contest (Electronic category).

Beca has performed at festivals and events, including Miami Fashion Week, POP Montreal and North by Northeast (NXNE).

Beca has appeared in many international media publications including: Stereogum, Flaunt magazine, PureVolume, The Deli magazine, Consequence of Sound and XLR8R.

Her music has appeared on Made in Chelsea, Dance Moms, Bones, and One Life to Live. Beca partnered with Bounty to compose and perform the song “Quicker Picker Upper."

== Discography ==
=== Studio albums ===
| Title | Details |
|---|---|
| Ecliptic (LP) | Label: LE Distribution; Year: 2015; Format: Digital Download |

=== Extended plays ===
| Title | Details |
|---|---|
| Born To Fly (EP) | Label: This Is Music Ltd; Year: 2012; Format: Digital download and limited edition LP |
| Let’s Run Wild (EP) | Label: This Is Music Ltd; Year: 2012; Format: Digital download and limited edition LP |

=== Singles ===
| Title | Year | Details | Album |
|---|---|---|---|
| "Future Foreigner" (Single) | 2016 | Label: LE Distribution | |
| "Hunted Me Down" (Single) | 2015 | Label: LE Distribution | Ecliptic (LP) |
| "Enabler" (Single) | 2015 | Label: LE Distribution | Ecliptic (LP) |
| "Meteor" (Single) | 2015 | Label: LE Distribution | Ecliptic (LP) |
| "Bayonet" (Single) | 2015 | Label: LE Distribution | Ecliptic (LP) |

== Music videos ==
| Title | Year | References |
|---|---|---|
| "Future Foreigner" | 2016 | |
| "Ice Cream" | 2015 | |
| "Meteor" | 2015 | |
| "Bayonet" | 2015 | |
| "Fall Into Light" | 2012 | |
| "Let's Run Wild" | 2012 | |
