= Becky Kennedy =

American psychologist

Rebecca Prince Kennedy
- Born: ~1983-1984
- Education: Duke University (BA); Teachers College, Columbia University (PhD)
- Spouse: Colin Kennedy
- Children: 3
- Scientific career
- Fields: Clinical psychology
- Thesis: Implementing Evidence-Based Practices Into Psychotherapy Training in Clinical Psychology PhD Programs (2010)

Rebecca Kennedy is an American clinical psychologist who is founder and chief executive officer of the Good Inside company, an online parenting advice service. She has been called the "millennial parent whisperer" by Time magazine. Her book Good Inside was a number one New York Times bestseller.

== Early life and education ==
Kennedy grew up in Scarsdale, New York, to a mother who was a social worker and a father who was a commodities trader. She attributes her experience as a "people pleaser" growing up and anorexia as a teenager with having inspired her to become a psychologist. She received a B.A. in psychology from Duke University and a Ph.D. in clinical psychology from Teachers College, Columbia University.

== Career ==
In 2020, at the beginning of the COVID-19 pandemic, Kennedy started the Good Inside Instagram account. In 2021, the Good Inside company was founded by Kennedy and another clinical psychologist, Erica Belsky. Good Inside raised $10.5 million in its "first round of venture-capital fundraising from Inspired Capital, an early-stage VC founded by millennial personal-finance guru Alexa von Tobel, G9 Ventures, and other undisclosed investors." It is a privately held company that operates as a member-subscription service providing varying modes of parenting advice to over one million people across the world, of which some 94% are mothers. As part of the Good Inside platform, Kennedy operates an Instagram account and podcast. The account became an online sensation two days after the first lock down in New York when Kennedy posted about how children would feel the pandemic through the reactions of those around them.

The basic ideas behind Kennedy's psychological approach is to assume that everyone is "good inside" and that children are complicated emotional beings like adults. Kennedy is opposed to "cry it out" sleep training unless it is unavoidable. The psychological theories underpinning Good Inside include attachment theory, mindfulness, emotional regulation, and Internal Family Systems Model. Kennedy has popularized, developed, or repurposed psychological concepts, including "Deeply Feeling Kids (DFKs)" (which has been trademarked), dysregulation, and reparenting. Good Inside Chatbot is powered by generative artificial intelligence.

Kennedy maintains a private practice in New York and is on the paid speaking circuit.

== Criticisms ==
The Financial Times accused Kennedy of being an "expert profiting from today's desperate parents" in "the confluence of social media and for-profit parenting advice". Writers for The Cut and New York magazine interviewed Kennedy and attended an event in New York, observing:

The audience felt like an impromptu gathering of an elite corps of highly effective school fundraisers. One group of four attendees I met all have children at the same elite private school where Kennedy sends her children.

The article suggested that rising anxiety among middle-class mothers explained the popularity of Good Inside. In The Guardian, Kennedy has been described as seizing a movement already in motion, providing millennial parents with the means to access mainstream psychology. The Week acknowledged criticisms of the gentle parenting approach but believes Good Inside offers "support and reinforcement" to millennial parents attempting to be emotionally-mindful parents.

== Personal life ==
Kennedy is married to Colin Kennedy, who works in financial technology. They have three children and live on the Upper West Side.
