= Women of Genesis =

Series of five books by Orson Scott Card

Book one in the Women of Genesis series

Women of Genesis is a series of novels by Orson Scott Card that began in 2000. The novels in this series are centred on the wives of the Biblical Patriarchs of the Book of Genesis. As of December 2024, three books have been published, and the fourth and fifth books in the series are currently listed as works in progress on Card's website.

== Books in the series ==
- Sarah (2000)
- Rebekah (2001)
- Rachel and Leah (2004)
- The Wives of Israel (forthcoming)
- The Sons of Rachel (forthcoming)

The narrative of Rebekah follows the story of Isaac through the eyes and perspective of Rebekah. The story-line does not deviate from the story told in the Book of Genesis, but Card does add details and characters of his own invention. In his introduction to the book, Card says that much of what he includes in the novel is speculation and adds that his task "was to show how good people can sometimes do bad things to those they love most". He goes on to say, "Isaac was headed for a disastrously wrong decision; Rebekah chose an equally wrong method of stopping him...but in the end, the result was a good one because good people made the best of it despite all the mistakes."

== See also ==
- List of works by Orson Scott Card
- Bible fiction
