= Rebecca (given name) =

Female given name

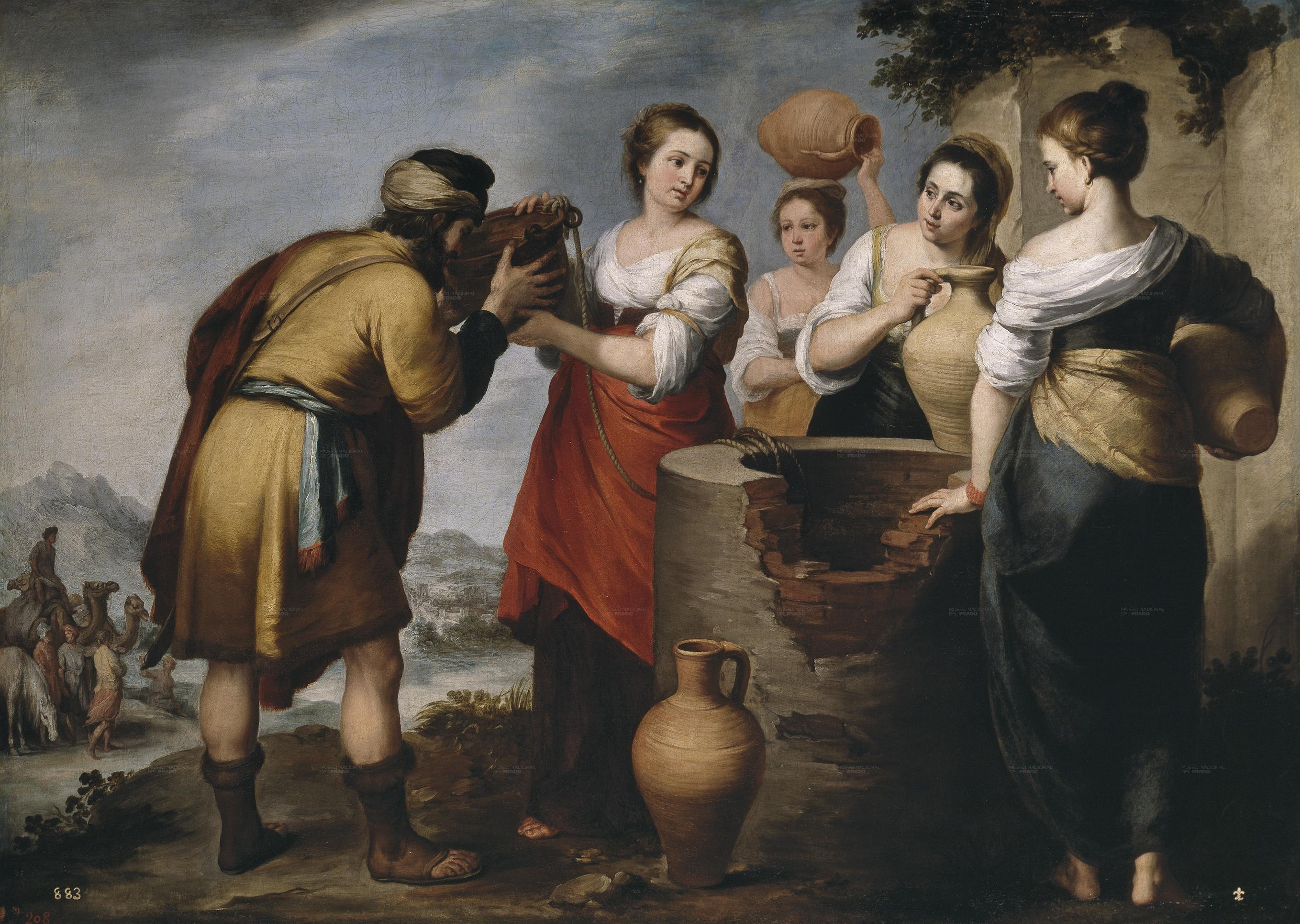
- The Biblical Rebecca and Eliezer in a painting by Bartolomé Esteban Murillo.
- Pronunciation: /rəˈbɛkə/ rə-BEK-ə
- Gender: Female

Origin
- Origin: Hebrew
- Meaning: "Moderator", To Tie, Noose, To Bind, Captivating, Strong Combatant, Hearty

Other names
- Nicknames: Becks; Becca; Becky; Bec; Beck; Bex; Becs; Reba; Riva; Rebby; Reb; Rebs; Becka; Bekah
- Related names: Becca, Becky, Reba,

Rebecca or Rebekah (Hebrew: רִבְקָה, Modern: Rivka, Tiberian: Rivqā, Yiddish: Rivke) is a feminine given name of Hebrew origin. It is the name of the biblical figure Rebecca, wife of Isaac and mother of Jacob and Esau. The name comes from the Semitic root ר-ב-ק (r-b-q), meaning "to tie firmly"; Jones' Dictionary of Old Testament Proper Names and the NOBS Study Bible Name List suggest the name means captivating beauty, or "to tie", "to bind". W. F. Albright held that it meant "soil, earth".

== Spelling ==
The Latin Vulgate uses the spelling Rebecca exclusively and it is followed by (ex. gr.) Wycliffe and the Bishops' Bible. In the Authorized Version of the 1600s, the spelling Rebekah is used in the Old Testament (Genesis) and the Latin "Rebecca" (representing Greek Bible Ῥεβέκκα) was retained in the New Testament (see Romans 9:10). So the earlier western spelling is "Rebecca", but both spellings (Rebecca and Rebekah) are used in the influential King James Version. Both are used in the English-speaking world today.

== Popularity ==
In the United Kingdom, a revival of Biblical names led to this name being ranked among the top 100 female names during the 1960s, the top 20 during the 1970s, and the top 10 during the 1980s; in 1994 it was the most popular female name. A decline in popularity followed; it slid out of the top 10 in 2000 and by 2009 had fallen to 77th. In 2013, it was ranked 120th.

In the United States, the name was used beginning with the colonization of the Puritans in New England in the 17th century. The name Rebecca goes up and down in the popularity rankings, but has consistently ranked in the top 200 most popular names for girls since at least 1880 (the first year for which the Social Security Administration has documented baby name popularity). In the year 2011, the Social Security Administration ranked Rebecca at 148th in popularity. In 2013, it was ranked 178th.

The name is also popular in other countries. In 2009, Rebeca was the 27th most popular name for baby girls in Romania.

== Variations ==
- Lepeka (Hawaiian)
- Bec
- Becca (English)
- Becka (English)
- Beckah (English)
- Becki (English)
- Beckie (English)
- Becky (English)
- Becbec (Filipino)
- Beka (English)
- Bekah (English)
- Fiqa (Malaysian)
- Rabqa (Arabic)
- Rafiqa (Arabic)
- Rafqa (Aramaic)
- Rebeca (Galician, Portuguese, Spanish, Welsh)
- Rébecca, Rebeque (French)
- Rebeccah (English)
- Rebecka (Swedish)
- Rebeckah (English)
- Rebeka (Albanian, Bulgarian, Czech, Hungarian, Polish, Serbian, Slovenian, Turkish, Yoruba)
- Rebekah (Hebrew, English)
- Rebekka (Danish, Finnish, German, Icelandic, Norwegian, Russian, Ukrainian)
- Rebekkah (English)
- Rebieka (Belarusian)
- Refika (Turkish)
- Repega (Armenian)
- Rebeca (Romanian)
- Revka, Revkah (Hebrew)
- Ribka, Ribkah, Ribkha, Rebecca (Indonesian)
- Rifka, Rifke (Yiddish)
- Ríobhca (Irish)
- Rivka, Rivqah (Hebrew) (The original Biblical form of which all the others are ultimately derived)
