= Reba Byrd Masterson =

American geologist (1882–1969)

Rebecca Byrd Masterson (January 19, 1882 – September 22, 1969) was an American petroleum geologist. Masterson was born and raised in Galveston, Texas. She was a survivor of the 1900 Galveston hurricane, losing her mother in the carnage. With the passing of her mother, Masterson took over the domestic duties in her household. She eventually attended university receiving her Bachelor of Science, and paving her career in geology as an independent geologist. She made many contributions to the field of geology over the course of her career. Until her death on September 22, 1969, she kept the mineral rights in more than 20 Texas counties and a tungsten mine in Colorado.

== Family life ==
Masterson lost her mother in the 1900 Galveston hurricane that she survived. Masterson had one brother and one sister, Wilmer D. Masterson and Lewis Fisher. Masterson also employed her nephews to mine the ore in her tungsten mine in Nederland. Both her great niece, Amanda Masterson, and her great-great nephew, Wilmer Dallam Masterson IV, attended UT.

During the year 1908, Reba's father, Branch T. Masterson, had filed a lawsuit on the behalf of his wife inheritance, who had died in the 1900 Great Galveston Hurricane. Branch Masterson worked with a wealthy lawyer named John W Harris, who had an adopted daughter, Anne Wilmer Dallam. Masterson would end up marrying Dallam (Reba's mother), however, at the time of their marriage it was the general consensus that Harris did not legally adopt her, but just generously took her in. Several years later, Harris would die as a Judge and his estate handed down to his natural children, since the adoption had scepticism surrounding it, Dallam was not on that list. Therefore, Branch filed the lawsuit after finding legitimate adoption papers. The finding of the papers meant that Reba's mother had a claim to Harris's estate.

Reba first attended the University of Texas in the same year that her father filed the lawsuit. The lawsuit carried on for nine years against close family friends, the Harrises. Reba missed several semesters during the years 1910, 1911 and 1912, which could be explained by helping her father with the lawsuit. After nine long years, the lawsuit was completed in 1917, with Reba and her other family members as beneficiaries (according to the Houston Post) to a settlement which concluded with land holdings in 60 Texas counties and shares in the Galveston Wharf. The total value of the shares and properties topped out at $2,223,860, which due to inflation, would have a grand total of $43,917,065.26 in 2019. Due to the winnings, after years of hardship, Reba and her family had a way to get ahead in the world. Her father, Branch used this opportunity as an way to become more involved with the oil business. Branch ended up becoming a director in The New York and Texas Oil Companies.

According to “Budge” (Anthony Dallam) Sheppard, Reba's great nephew, there is a family story where Reba lost a hand of poker to Dad Joiner, where the pot consisted of an oil and gas lease. Furthermore, Budge also accounted for a story where Reba was testifying as a witness in a lawsuit and received several threats trying to deter her from testifying. In response to the threats, her father, Branch, purchased an .32 caliber pistol for her to travel to and from the trials with.

Reba Masterson had a noted influence on her family who continues to love petroleum geology. Reba's great-great nephew, Wilmer Dallam Masterson IV is a University of Texas graduate in geology and works in the oil and gas business. Furthermore, his daughter, Kathleen, is in the process of completing her degree in geology at Colorado State University. Moreover, Reba's great niece, Amanda Masterson, spent the duration of her career at the Texas Bureau of Economic Geology. Amanda, while working for the Bureau, discovered a prospect map of a configuration south of Castroville, which Reba, when she was 49, submitted to the Bureau while doing consulting work for them.

== Education ==
In 1908, Masterson enrolled at the University of Texas where she began studying geology. She was the second female graduate student at the University of Texas. She then moved to the University of Colorado where she received her Bachelor of Science in 1915. During her time as a student, Masterson, participated in multiple geology activities and scouting.

Reba decided to enroll in college at 26 years old. She wasn't able to go to college right away as her father believed women should not attend college. He eventually gave in, allowing Reba to attend at the University of Texas. The geology department at the University of Texas was very small with only one professor, professor F.W. Simonds and one tutor, Alexander Deussen. Later on, another tutor was hired, by the name Francis Whitney. Reba Masterson and Francis Whitney were the same age. Reba studied at the University of Texas from 1908 to 1912 and had joined a sorority called Kappa Kappa Gamma. Reba also joined the Young Women's Christian Association (YWCA) and was very active in the club. Through her efforts in joining clubs Reba made life-long friends like Eunice Aden in Texas. Reba missed multiple semesters in 1910 to 1912 due to helping her fathers with a long legal battle. In 1912, she left college without finishing her degree and moved to Colorado where she attended the University of Colorado. It is unknown as to why she moved and what caused her three-year delay. She attended classes at the University of Colorado from the fall of 1912 to the summer of 1915. Reba had taken extra time to finish her degree because she left Colorado, which may have been because of another hurricane in Galveston in August 1915. This was right before her final semester at CU. She finished her degree through correspondence in 1916.

During her time in Colorado she joined Kappa Kappa Gamma and became active in the YWCA as she missed her friends in Texas. She was teased by her fellow students and her teachers for her Texas accent, but Reba did not care as the geology in Colorado was great. Reba was intrigued by the mountain range in Colorado known as the Front Range. A professor at the University of Colorado, Russell George helped Reba throughout her schooling in Colorado. He provided her the guidance she needed as the faculty was extremely small with only three instructors, Reba struggled with this as there was much more strength and diversity at the University of Texas. Luckily, the University of Colorado accepted all of her credits from the University of Texas, so Reba finished her degree at the University of Colorado and graduated with a Bachelor of Science in 1916. She was 34 years old.

During Reba's time in the sorority Kappa Kappa Gamma, she met Eleanor Brackenridge who at the time was a notable activist for the rights of women and a city member of the Fraternity. She was quite influential with all the Kappa Kappa Gammas. Reba was most likely responsible for Eleanor's trip to Galveston in 1910 where she was there to speak about women's suffrage. Reba introduced Eleanor to Ava Ellisor who helped Eleanor a lot with woman's rights, thanks to Reba. Ava Ellisor was heavily influenced by Reba as she followed Rebas path by enrolling in the University of Texas and majored in geology.

== The Hurricane ==
Reba Masterson survived the Great Galveston Hurricane when she was only 18 years old. The following is a direct account from her brother Wilmer D. Masterson on the faithful day that stripped their family of their mother and nine other family members.

"Debris was now jammed against our row of trees and we knew that they would go down very soon. I was pretty well fogged trying to keep my mother from falling, so after my brother had a brief rest he took my place and I moved to another branch of the tree. Only a few minutes later the tree went down and piles of debris swept over us. Somehow under the water he lost my mother. A few months later her body was found about seven miles distant on the mainland."

Reba was able to avoid being swept under the current by holding onto a tree and later found refuge at her aunt's house. The family strategically cut large holes in the floor to relieve pressure of the waves which prevents the house being swept away. Her ability to survive this catastrophe led to her become the first female petroleum geologist. The tragedy of losing her mother led Reba to take more responsibility around the household.

== Career ==
Once Masterson graduated from the University of Colorado she started her career in geology. Learning the ropes of the oil industry from her father, Branch Masterson, she started to make a name for herself by traveling across the South and Midwest scouting oil leases. During her years in Colorado she was involved in acquiring and overseeing oil and gas properties in Texas. Reba's great nephew, Budge related that Reba was present in November 1915 when the discovery well for Damon's Mound wells located 30 miles west of Galveston. Family members enjoyed royalties from that field for years. Over the years, she gained experience conducting reconnaissance work in oil fields in Kansas, Illinois, West Virginia, Pennsylvania, Indiana and Kentucky. She also studied the structural geology of Oklahoma, Louisiana and Texas by working as an independent geologist. Her work in the oil and gas industry was widely controversial, as many companies did not allow women to work on wells. Reba's interest in geology lead her to buy land, not for ordinary surface uses, but for the minerals. When time came to sell, she would retain half of the mineral rights to the land, only selling the surface itself. This was most likely possible for a woman in her time because of her brother Thomas, who was a lawyer. Reba's great nephew, Budge, recalls that Reba had mineral rights to properties in 20 counties in Texas. Masterson used her geological knowledge of microfossils to earn herself mineral rights and the ability to work in a male dominated field. She was the first female geologist to work fully in the oil patch, and due to her successful entrepreneur she was also the first independent oil woman. Her great nephew, Budge, spent two summers working with her on her tungsten mine near Nederland, Colorado. Budge and Bill worked on a mine together one summer after WWII when tungsten prices had dropped and the mine needed to produce a certain tonnage for the claim to not be reverted. The two would mine ore and add dirt to what they mined to make up for the tonnage, take it to the smelter in Nederland all while fulfilling the requirements and retaining the claim. She continued to mine the property during WWII when tungsten prices were very high. In 1923 Masterson joined the AAPG (American Association of Petroleum Geologists).

At this time, Masterson was one of the seven women among the 74 members in the AAPG. She joined after a few years after her fathers’ death in 1920 in Colorado. On her application card, she stated that she was a “student of geology” and that she had spent a year in Kansas, Illinois, West Virginia, Pennsylvania, Indiana and Kentucky doing reconnaissance work on the oil fields. Furthermore, she also wrote about how she spent five years studying the structural geometry of Oklahoma, Louisiana, and Texas. In 1923 AAPG's 9th annual meeting was hosted, Reba and her six young protégés, Alva Ellisor, Esther Richards Applin, Hedwig Knicker, Laura Lane, Emma Jne Coffman, and Bess Stiles were among the 74 founding members. She has been a member for 48 years, until her death in 1969.

It is suspected that between leaving Boulder, Colorado and her time of membership to AAPG, she was evaluating and investigating oil properties, and most likely began her work on oil patches the summer she left Boulder in 1915. There is a possibility she was doing reconnaissance work between her coursework in University of Texas, Austin and enrolling in Colorado.

Reba and Eunice, a friend from the University of Texas, started a girl's camp (Camp Kiva) which became very popular, at Medina Lake, 30 miles west of San Antonio. They both dedicated significant time and money to make it successful, and it was. Reba and Eunice were frequently written about in the San Antonio Express and other Texas newspapers regarding their travels and participation in society events, including notices about Camp Kiva. Reba eventually set up a scholarship at the University of Texas in Eunice's name for physical education students honoring Eunice's years there as a physical education innovator.
