= Rebecca Jackson (presenter) =

English racing driver and television presenter

- Born: 28 August 1982 (age 44); Horndean, Hampshire, England
- Education: Bath Spa University
- Occupations: Motor dealer, Racing driver, Television presenter
- Children: 2

Rebecca Jackson is an English racing driver and television presenter, and former motor dealer.

== Early life ==
Jackson was born in 1982 in Horndean, Hampshire. Her engineer father restored classic cars and competed in the annual Birkett 6 Hour Team Relay Race at Silverstone race circuit, and her mother is a driving instructor.

Jackson learned to drive in a farm in Devon, with her first competitive motorsport a precision driving autosolo competition which she won. She passed her driving test aged 17 after two months of lessons. and purchased her first car – a Peugeot 205 1.4 GR, continuing to use farmland to practise precision driving.

Jackson studied natural science for a year at the University of Bath, before changing institution to Bath Spa University, graduating in 2004 with a 2:1 degree in business studies.

== Career ==
=== Motor trade ===
Jackson set up a used car business called RJ Internet Showroom in 2007, started with £300 and a Vauxhall Cavalier, selling budget cars for under £1000. Jackson then set-up and managed RJ Prestige Cars, based in Rotherwick near Hook, Hampshire, with Andrew Arkley. Jackson sold the business in 2016. The business failed to file accounts and was deregistered by companies house in 2020.

=== Media ===
Jackson presented video reviews for CarBuyer with co-presenter Mat Watson reviewing features of new cars. In August 2014 she moved to Telegraph Cars, and then to WhatCar. Jackson writes a motoring blog for the Girlracer website.

Jackson and Watson presented the ITV4 consumer show I Want That Car in autumn of 2013. It involved the presenters finding and reviewing cars for the buyers as well as negotiating a selling price. During the 25th season of Fifth Gear, Jackson served as a "Guest Presenter" on the sixth episode where she and Tiff Needell took part in the Exeter Trial.

In addition, Jackson co‑presented Ali A’s Superchargers and Modern Wheels or Classic Steals on Dave, offering car‑buying advice by helping buyers choose between modern vehicles or classic cars alongside Elo King of The London Motor Museum.

She has appeared several times as a motoring expert on Steph’s Packed Lunch on Channel 4 and is frequently on BBC Radio as one of their motoring experts, discussing current motoring issues and offering commentary on automotive topics.

== Motorsport ==
Jackson is a member of British Racing and Sports Car Club. In addition, Jackson co‑presented Ali A’s Superchargers and Modern Wheels or Classic Steals on Dave, offering car‑buying advice by helping buyers choose between modern vehicles or classic cars alongside Elo King of The London Motor Museum.

She appeared several times as a motoring expert on Steph’s Packed Lunch on Channel 4 and is frequently on BBC Radio as one of their motoring experts, discussing current motoring issues and offering commentary on automotive topics.

=== Project Le Mans: 2013–2016 ===
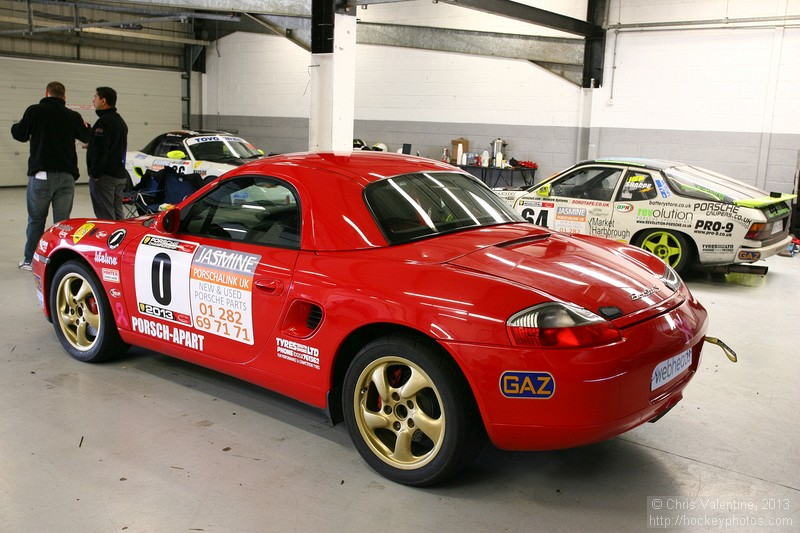
Jackson's 2013 Porsche Boxster

At Autosport International 2013, Jackson launched Project Le Mans, her four-year plan of competing in the endurance race. This plan involves winning the British Racing and Sports Car Club (BRSCC) Porsche Production Boxster class championship 2013, which she subsequently won, out of the four drivers in her class. In 2014, year 2, Jackson planned on competing in the higher Race Spec Porsche Boxster class and in year 3, the Porsche 911 GT3 Cup Challenge. The plan for 2016, the final year of the project is to be racing in the Porsche Carrera Cup Great Britain and 24 Hours of Le Mans.

=== BRSCC Porsche Championship 2011 ===
Jackson debuted in 2011 in the BRSCC Porsche Championship with Porsche Racing Drivers Association without prior experience of rear wheel drive racing in a 35-year-old white Porsche 924 and finished 8th of 16.

Jackson - Race Results 2011
Event No.	Circuit	Race	Grid Position	Result	No. of Drivers	Points Scored
1	Silverstone	1	10	8	8	15
1	Silverstone	2	10	8	8	15
2	Donington Park	1	8	8	9	15
2	Donington Park	2	-	-	8	-
3	Cadwell Park	1	-	-	5	-
3	Cadwell Park	2	-	-	8	-
4	Oulton Park	1	-	-	6	-
4	Oulton Park	2	7	5	6	18
5	Rockingham	1	10	13	13	10
5	Rockingham	2	-	-	11	-
6	Brands Hatch	1	10	10	11	13
6	Brands Hatch	2	10	11	11	12
7	Snetterton	1	7	10	10	13
7	Snetterton	2	10	7	10	16
8	Rockingham	1	4	6	9	17
8	Rockingham	2	6	7	9	16

=== 2012 ===
Racing in the Porsche 924 class for the second season, Jackson finished 4th of 20.

Jackson - Race Results 2012
Event No.	Circuit	Race	Grid Position	Result	No. of Drivers	Points Scored
1	Oulton Park	1	-	-	7	-
1	Oulton Park	2	8	3	7	21
2	Snetterton	1	3	1	8	25
2	Snetterton	2	1	3	7	21
2	Snetterton	3	2	2	7	23
3	Cadwell Park	1	8	5	7	8
3	Cadwell Park	2	5	5	7	18
4	Brands Hatch	1	6	5	10	18
4	Brands Hatch	2	5	3	11	21
4	Brands Hatch	3	6	9	10	14
5	Silverstone	1	4	4	10	19
5	Silverstone	2	-	-	9	-
6	Rockingham	1	-	-	5	-
6	Rockingham	2	-	-	5	-
7	Croft Circuit	1	6	4	8	19
7	Croft Circuit	2	4	4	9	19
8	Donington Park	1	-	-	8	-
8	Donington Park	2	10	7	10	16
8	Donington Park	3	4	4	9	19

Race event 2 at Snetterton is where Jackson achieved her first race track win.

=== 2013 ===
For the 2013 season, Jackson progressed to the Porsche Production Boxster class, driving a red Porsche Boxster S. She won the class by a large margin with 201 points, where there were 4 in class, coming 19th overall.

Jackson - Race Results 2013
Event No.	Circuit	Race	Grid Position	Result	No. of Drivers	Points Scored
1	Rockingham	1	-	-	2	-
1	Rockingham	2	-	-	2	-
1	Rockingham	3	-	-	2	-
2	Silverstone	1	2	1	2	13.5
2	Silverstone	2	1	2	2	11.5
3	Zandvoort	1	2	1	3	12.5
3	Zandvoort	2	1	1	3	12.5
3	Zandvoort	3	1	2	3	12.5
4	Snetterton	1	2	1	2	13.5
4	Snetterton	2	1	1	2	13.5
5	Brands Hatch	1	-	-	2	-
5	Brands Hatch	2	3	1	3	12.5
5	Brands Hatch	3	3	1	3	13.5
6	Oulton Park	1	2	2	2	11.5
6	Oulton Park	2	2	2	2	11.5
7	Cadwell Park	1	1	1	2	13.5
7	Cadwell Park	2	1	1	2	13.5
8	Donington Park	1	2	1	2	12.5
8	Donington Park	2	1	2	2	11.5
8	Donington Park	3	1	2	2	11.5

=== GT Cup 2015 ===
Jackson joined ex-BRSCC Porsche racer Mike Sellar to co-drive his 997 Cup in the GTB class of the 2015 season of Porsche GT Cup.

==== World Record ====
On 9–10 June 2015 Jackson and fellow Telegraph motoring correspondent Andrew Frankel set a new Guinness World Record for the highest number of countries visited by car using a single tank of fuel in an Audi A6: the Netherlands, Belgium, Luxembourg, France, Switzerland, Austria, Liechtenstein, Germany, Slovenia, Italy, Croatia, Bosnia, Serbia, Hungary. The event was supported by Audi and the RAC; the pair travelled a total of 1159 miles at an average speed of 49 mph.

== Personal life ==
Jackson also teaches and performs salsa dancing. She sits on the Steering Group of Global Dance Network and has judged competitions. The regular salsa dancing along with gym workouts and hot yoga are used by Jackson to maintain fitness for races.

Jackson also goes karting and purchased a Mazda RX-8 to use for track days.

On 20 December 2018, Jackson announced she was pregnant with twin babies. She gave birth to a boy and a girl in February 2019.
