= Porsche Racing Drivers Association =

The Porsche Racing Drivers Association motor racing championship was started in 1991 by Jeff May. The 2-litre, front-engined Porsche 924 cars were augmented in 2010 by the 3.2 litre, mid-engined Boxster models with the opening Boxster championship being won by David Clark. The 2012 season saw the introduction of a production class for Boxsters to run alongside the existing fully converted race-spec Boxsters and the 924s. The Championship is organized by a committee and run under the British Racing and Sports Car Club.

== Classes ==
The three-class structure offers drivers an opportunity to race competitively, with a clear route for racing progression. Full technical specifications are available from the Official website.

=== Class C 924 ===
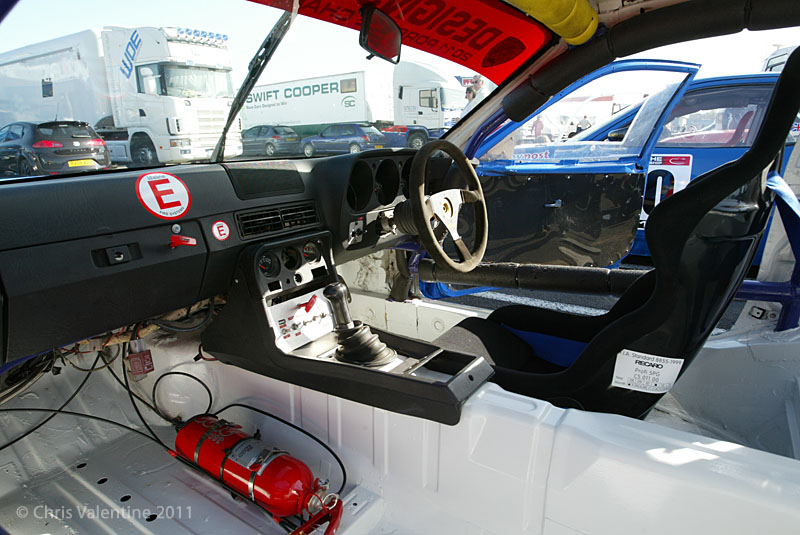
924 interior

Powered by a 2-litre 4 cylinder engine driving the rear wheels, the 924 has run in the Championship since its foundation. Because of its low cost, low-tech design, and ease of maintenance, the 924 makes the series one of the more affordable ways to enter single-marque Porsche racing in the UK.

=== Class B Production Boxster ===
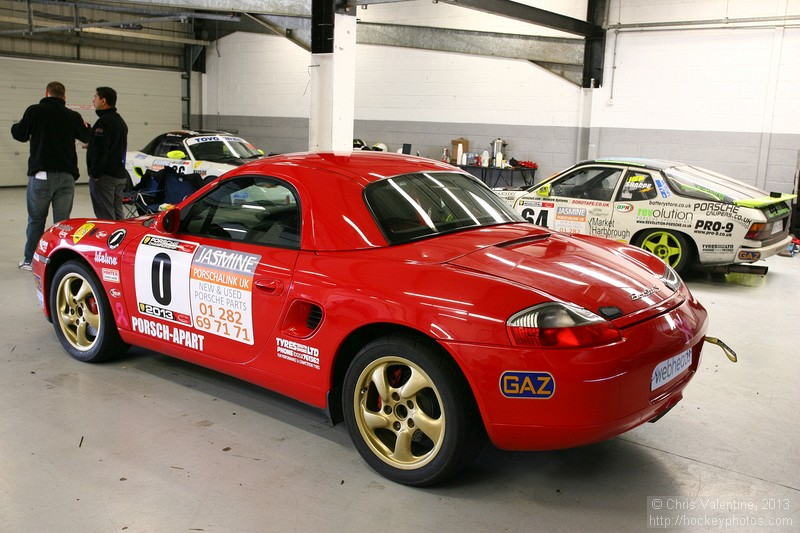
Production Boxster

This class was added for the 2012 season in an attempt to reduce the cost of entry to Boxster racing. The 3.2 litre 986 Boxster cars use original Porsche standard suspension and 17" wheels.

=== Class A Race Boxster ===
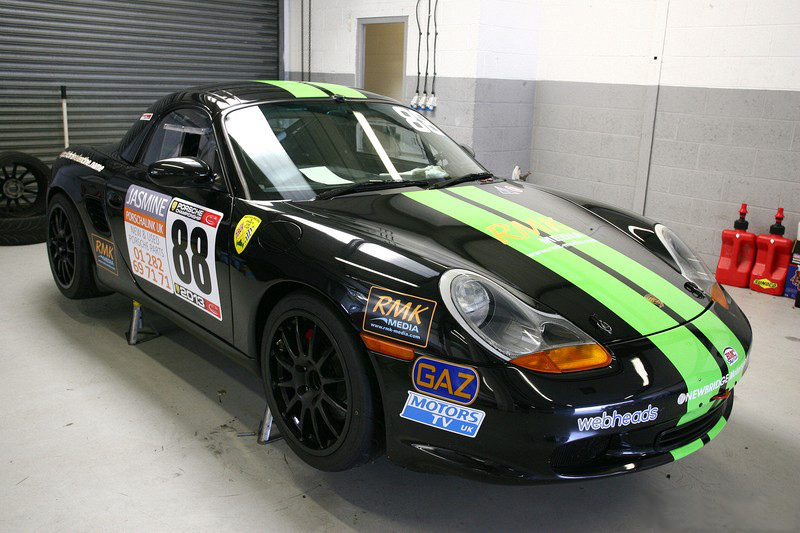
Race Boxster

Class A consists of fully converted 3.2 litre 986 or 987 Boxsters on Gaz shock absorbers, Team Dynamics Rimstock ProRace 1.3 wheels and Toyo R888 tyres. An aero package was added for the 2017 season.

== List of Champions ==
- 1992: Remy Bopp
- 1993: Richard Lloyd
- 1994: Michael Neuhoff
- 1995: Paul Stephens
- 1996: Gerry Taylor
- 1997: Nick Adams
- 1998: Tony Brown
- 1999: Mark McAleer
- 2000: Mark McAleer
- 2001: Keith Penman
- 2002: Ryan Hooker
- 2003: James Neal
- 2004: Chris Milne
- 2005: Steve Cheetham
- 2006: Gary Duckman
- 2007: Graham Heard
- 2008: Matt Davies
- 2009: Will Penrose
- 2010: Dave Clark (Boxster), Andrew Hannington (924)
- 2011: Dave Clark (Boxster), Steven Brown (924)
- 2012: Richard Styrin (Race Spec Boxster), Stephen Potts (Production Boxster), Alastair Kirkham (924)
- 2013: Richard Styrin (Race Spec Boxster), Rebecca Jackson (Production Boxster), Alastair Kirkham (924)
- 2014: Jonathan Greensmith (Race Spec Boxster), Jayson Flegg (Production Boxster), Simon Hawksley (924)
- 2015: Ed Hayes (Race Spec Boxster), Michael Goodacre (Production Boxster), Adam Croft (924)
- 2016: Rick Styrin (Race Spec Boxster), Andy Baker (Production Boxster), Linda Warren (924)
- 2017: Ed Hayes (Race Spec Boxster), Andy Baker (Production Boxster), Pip Hammond (924)
- 2018: Adam Southgate (Race Spec Boxster), Leigh Bowden (Production Boxster), Gavin Johnson (924)
- 2019: Garry Lawrence (Class A Supersport Boxster), Pete Smith (Class D Classic 924)

== Season Calendars ==
=== 2020 season ===
After a season (2019) with very low numbers, the BRSCC took the decision to hand the Championship over to the CALM All Porsche Trophy for 2020. The PDA committee disbanded.

=== 2019 season ===
Title sponsor: Toyo Tires; Partners: Hartech Porsche Specialists, Pie Performance

- Round 1 - 23 / 24 March - Brands Hatch (Indy) - 2 Races
- Round 2 - 20 / 21 April - Snetterton 300 - 3 Races
- Round 3 - 11 / 12 May - Cadwell Park - 3 Races
- Round 4 - 6 / 7 July - Croft Circuit - 3 Races
- Round 5 - 27 / 28 July - Brands Hatch (Indy) - 2 Races
- Round 6 - 17 / 18 August - Anglesey - 2 Races
- Round 7 - 5 / 6 October - Silverstone (Int'l) - 3 Races
- Round 8 - 19 / 20 October - Donington Park - 3 Races

For 2019, all classes were renamed (Class A Supersport, Class C Production Boxster, Class D Classic 924) and a class for 2.7 litre engined Boxsters (Class B Sport Boxster 2.7) was introduced. This new class was the first to permit fitting of a bolt-in roll cage for the Boxster to help minimise conversion costs.

=== 2018 season ===
Title sponsor: Toyo Tires; Partners: Jasmine Porschalink, Hartech Porsche Specialists, Wharfside Electrical, Ryan Motorsport Insurance

- Round 1 - 24 March - Oulton Park - 2 races
- Round 2 - 12 & 13 May - Knockhill - 3 races
- Round 3 - 2 & 3 June - Cadwell Park - 2 races
- Round 4 - 23 & 24 June - Rockingham - 3 races
- Round 5 - 14 & 15 July - Castle Combe - 3 races
- Round 6 - 11 & 12 August - Anglesey Intl - 3 races
- Round 7 - 8 & 9 September - Brands Hatch (Indy) - 3 races
- Round 8 - 20 & 21 October - Donington (Indy) - 3 races

The 2018 season saw the introduction - as an experiment - of compulsory pit stops in the third race of selected rounds. The PDA supported BRSCC's new TCR UK Series at Knockhill (the PDA's first visit to that circuit) and Castle Combe and benefitted from live streamed video coverage as a result.

=== 2017 season ===
Title sponsor: Toyo Tires; Partners: Jasmine Porschalink, Hartech Porsche Specialists, Wharfside Electrical, Autosport Apparel, Ryan Motorsport Insurance

- Round 1 - 25 March - Oulton Park - 2 races
- Round 2 - 8 & 9 April - Silverstone International - 3 races
- Round 3 - 6 & 7 May - Cadwell Park - 2 races
- Round 4 - 10 & 11 June - Snetterton 300 - 3 races
- Round 5 - 15 & 16 July - Castle Combe - 3 races
- Round 6 - 5 & 6 August - Anglesey Intl - 3 races
- Round 7 - 16 & 17 September - Rockingham - 3 races
- Round 8 - 21 & 22 October - Brands Hatch - 3 races

The 2017 season included a special anniversary race, celebrating 25 years since the championship was founded. 18 cars entered, taking part in two sprint races on the Donington Park Indy circuit.

=== 2016 season ===
Title sponsor: Toyo Tires; Partners: Jasmine Porschalink, Hartech Porsche Specialists, FineDrinks Cooperative, Wharfside Electrical, Royal Purple UK

- Snetterton 300 2 / 3 April 2016 3 Races
- Rockingham 14 / 15 May 2016 3 Races
- Oulton Park 25 June 2016 2 Races
- Castle Combe 16 / 17 July 2016 2 Races
- Anglesey 6 / 7 August 2016 3 Races
- Donington Park 27 / 28 August 2016 3 Races
- Mallory Park 25 September 2016 3 Races
- Silverstone (International) 15 / 16 October 2016

=== 2015 season ===
Title sponsor: Toyo Tires; Partners: Jasmine Porschalink; Fuchs

- 18 Apr Oulton Park
- 16 May Rockingham
- 20 June Zandvoort
- 18 July Cadwell Park
- 22 Aug Brands Hatch
- 12 Sept Croft
- 17 Oct Silverstone (International)

=== 2014 season ===
Title sponsor: Toyo Tires; Partners: Jasmine Porschalink

- 5 / 6 April Silverstone (International)
- 10 May Croft
- 7 / 8 June Zolder
- 12 / 13 July Rockingham
- 9 / 10 August Anglesey
- 30 August Oulton Park
- 21 September Brands Hatch (Indy)
- 18 / 19 October Donington Park

=== 2013 season ===
Title sponsor: Toyo Tires; Partners: Jasmine Porschalink, webheads

- 6 / 7 April Rockingham
- 11 / 12 May Silverstone (National)
- 8 / 9 June Zandvoort
- 13 / 14 July Snettteron 300
- 3 / 4 August Brands Hatch
- 31 August Oulton Park
- 21 September Cadwell Park
- 19 / 20 October Donington Park

=== 2012 season ===
Title sponsor: The Logson Group

- 31 March Oulton Park
- 28 / 29 April Snetterton 300
- 13 May Cadwell Park
- 9 / 10 June Brands Hatch
- 28 / 29 July Silverstone (National)
- 18 /19 August Rockingham
- 8 / 9 September Croft Circuit
- 20 / 21 October Donington Park

=== 2011 season ===
Title sponsor: design911

- 10 April 2011 Silverstone
- 15 May 2011 Donington
- 6 June 2011 Cadwell Park
- 18 June 2011 Oulton Park
- 17 July 2011 Rockingham
- 14 August 2011 Brands Hatch
- 18 September 2011 Snetterton

=== 2010 season ===
- Rounds 1&2–10 April 2010 Cadwell Park
- Rounds 3&4–8 May 2010 Oulton Park
- Rounds 5&6–28 May 2010 Snetterton
- Rounds 7&8–26 June 2010 Anglesey
- Rounds 9&10–18 July 2010 Mallory
- Rounds 11&12–29 August 2010 Rockingham
- Rounds 13&14–12 September 2010 Brands Hatch
- Rounds 15&16–24 October 2010 Snetterton

=== 2008 season ===
- Rounds 1& 2: Snetterton (Norfolk) – 30 March 2008
- Rounds 3 & 4: Silverstone (Northamptonshire) – 12 & 13 April 2008
- Round 5: Oulton Park (Cheshire) – 10 May 2008
- Rounds 6 & 7: Cadwell Park (Lincolnshire) – 22 June 2008
- Rounds 8 & 9: Anglesey (North Wales) – 19 & 20 July 2008
- Rounds 10 & 11: Brands Hatch (Kent) – 16 & 17 August 2008
- Rounds 12 & 13: Mallory Park (Leicestershire) – 28 September 2008
