= Porsche 924 =

German sports car built 1976–1988

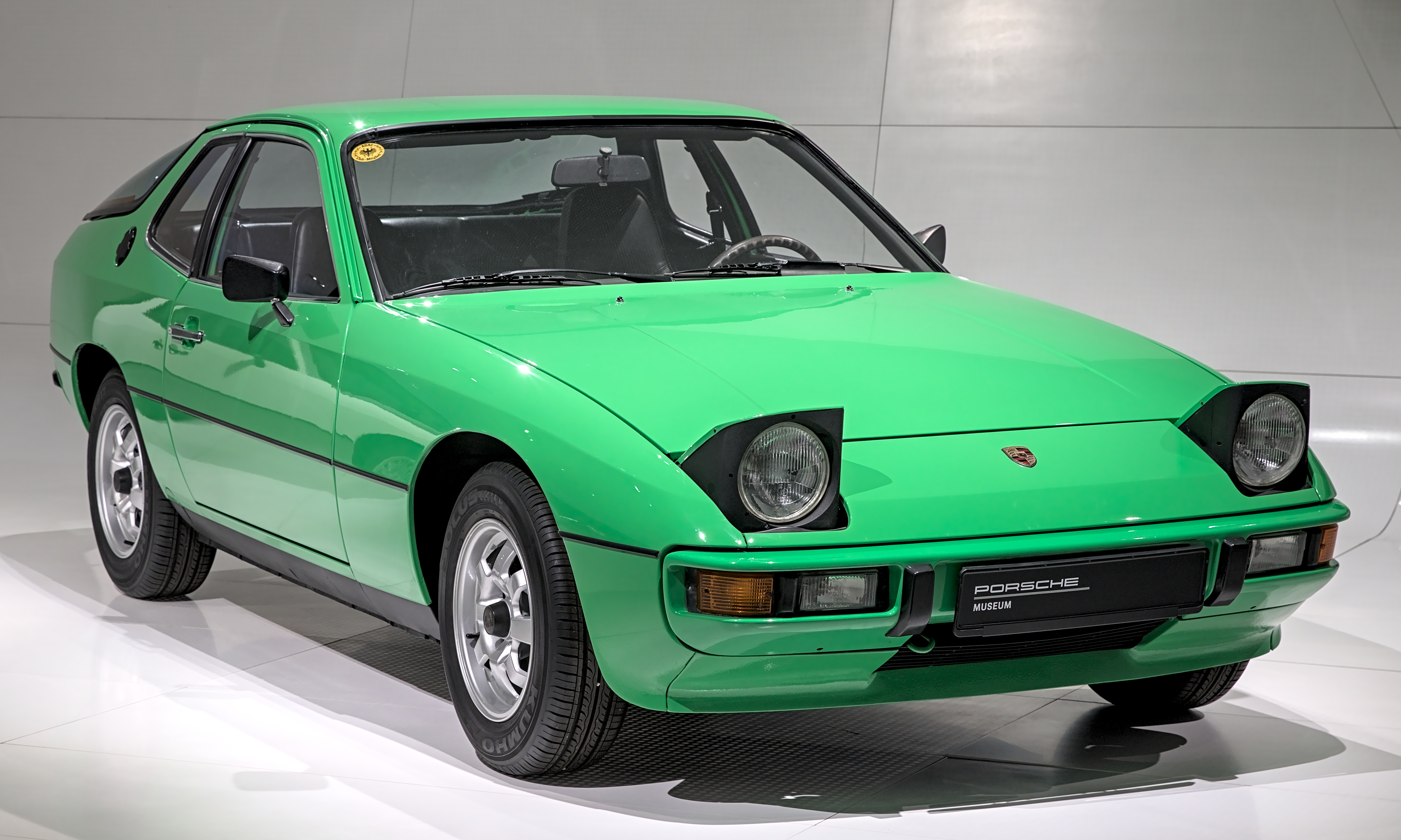

Overview
- Manufacturer: Porsche AG
- Production: 1976–1988
- Assembly: Germany: Neckarsulm, Stuttgart
- Designer: Harm Lagaay (Porsche AG)

Body and chassis
- Class: Sports car
- Body style: 2-door 2+2 coupé
- Layout: Front-engine, rear-wheel-drive layout

Powertrain
- Engine: 2.0 L VW EA831 I4; 2.0 L VW EA831 turbo I4; 2.5 L M44/40 I4
- Transmission: 3-speed automatic 4-speed manual 5-speed Getrag manual

Dimensions
- Wheelbase: 2,400 mm (94.5 in)
- Length: 4,200 mm (165.4 in)
- Width: 1,685 mm (66.3 in)
- Height: 1,270 mm (50.0 in)
- Curb weight: 1,242 kg (2,738 lb)

Chronology
- Predecessor: Porsche 914
- Successor: Porsche 944

The Porsche 924 is a sports car produced by Porsche in Neckarsulm, Germany, from 1976 until 1988. A two-door, 2+2 coupé, the 924 replaced the 912E and 914 as the company's entry-level model.

Although the 928 was designed first, the 924 was the first production road-going Porsche to use water cooling and a front-engine, rear-wheel-drive layout. It was also the first Porsche to be offered with a conventional fully automatic transmission. Like the 914, the 924 began as a joint venture with Volkswagen (VW). Although VW canceled plans to sell a version under its own nameplate, opting to market the independently-developed Scirocco instead, the 924 was assembled in a VW-operated plant and initially used a VW engine.

The 924 made its public debut in November 1975, and a turbocharged version was introduced in 1978. In response to increasing competition, Porsche introduced an upgraded version with a new Porsche-built engine as the 944, which replaced the 924 in the U.S. in 1983. In 1985, VW discontinued the engine used in the 924, prompting Porsche to use a slightly detuned 944 engine instead, drop the Turbo model, rename the vehicle as the 924S, and reintroduce it in the U.S. The 924 was a sales success, with just over 150,000 produced.

== History ==
The 924 was originally a joint project of Volkswagen and Porsche created by the Vertriebsgesellschaft (VG), the joint sales and marketing company funded by Porsche and VW to market and sell sports cars (Ludvigsen: Porsche, Excellence was Expected). For Volkswagen, it was intended to be that company's flagship coupé sports car, and was dubbed "Project 425" during its development. For Porsche, it was to be its entry-level sports car, replacing the 914. At the time, Volkswagen lacked a significant internal research and design division for developing sports cars; further, Porsche had been doing the bulk of the company's development work anyway, per a deal that went back to the 1940s. In keeping with this history, Porsche was contracted to develop a new sporting vehicle, with the caveat that this vehicle must work with an existing VW/Audi straight-four engine. Porsche chose a rear-wheel drive layout and a rear-mounted transaxle for the design to help provide 48/52 front/rear weight distribution; this slight rear weight bias aided both traction and brake balance.

The 1973 oil crisis, a series of automobile-related regulatory changes enacted during the 1970s, and a change of directors at Volkswagen made the case for a VW sports car less striking, and the 425 project was put on hold. After serious deliberation at VW, the project was scrapped entirely after a decision was made to move forward with the cheaper, more practical Golf-based Scirocco instead. Porsche, which needed a model to replace the 914, made a deal with Volkswagen leadership to buy the design back. The 914 was discontinued before the 924 entered production, which resulted in the reintroduction of the Porsche 912 to the North American market as the 912E for one year to fill the gap.

The deal specified that the car would be built at the ex-NSU factory in Neckarsulm, located north of the Porsche headquarters in Stuttgart, with Volkswagen becoming the subcontractor. Volkswagen employees would do the actual production line work (supervised by Porsche's own production specialists), and Porsche would own the design. The car made its debut at a November 1975 press launch at the harbour at La Grande Motte, Camargue in the south of France, rather than at a motor show. The relative cheapness of building the car made it both profitable and fairly easy for Porsche to finance. While it was criticised for its performance, it nevertheless became one of Porsche's best-selling models.

The original design used an Audi-sourced four-speed manual transmission from a front wheel drive car, albeit placed and used as a rear transaxle. It was mated to VW's EA831 2.0 L inline-four engine, variants of which were used in the Audi 100 and the Volkswagen LT van (common belief is that "the engine originated in the LT van", but it first appeared in the Audi car, and has a Porsche-designed cylinder head in 924 form). The Audi engine, equipped with a Weber/Holley carburetor, was also used in the 1977–1979 AMC Gremlin, Concord, and Spirit, as well as the AMC postal jeeps. The 924 engine used a new Porsche-designed cylinder head combined with Bosch K-Jetronic fuel injection, producing 125 PS (92 kW) in European spec. United States vehicle emission standards limited the engine to just 95 hp (71 kW), which was then improved to 110 hp (82 kW) in mid-1977 with the introduction of a catalytic converter and a slightly higher compression ratio. North American models also featured prominent low-speed impact bumpers that lacked integral fog lights at the front, and round reflective side-marker lamps front and rear. The four-speed manual was the only transmission available for the initial 1976 model, later this was replaced by a five-speed dog-leg unit. An Audi three-speed automatic was offered starting with the 1977.5 model. In 1980, the five-speed transmission was changed to a conventional H-pattern, with reverse now on the right beneath fifth gear.

In 1980, the North American model received some minor changes, including a three-way catalyst and slightly higher compression. Nonetheless, the strong Deutsche Mark and US inflation severely hampered sales, as a well equipped 924 could now easily cost twice as much as the considerably more powerful Nissan 280ZX.

In Japan, the 924 was sold at Mizwa Motors dealerships specialising in North American and European vehicles, with left hand drive for its entire generation.

A five-speed transmission, available in normally aspirated cars (type 016) starting in 1979 and standard on all turbos (type G31), was a dog-leg shift pattern Porsche unit, with first gear below reverse on the left side. This was robust, but expensive due to some 915 internal parts, and was replaced for 1980 with a normal H-pattern Audi five-speed on all non-turbo cars. This lighter duty design was not originally used on the more powerful 924 Turbo. The brakes were solid discs at the front and drums at the rear. The car was criticized in Car and Driver magazine for this braking arrangement, which was viewed as a step backward from the 914's standard four-wheel disc brakes. However, four-wheel disc brakes, five stud hubs and alloys from the 924 Turbo were available on the base 924 as an "S" package starting with the 1980 model year. Also, standard brakes could be optioned on the turbo as a cost-saving measure.

The overall styling was created by Dutch designer Harm Lagaay, a member of the Porsche styling team, with the folding headlights, sloping bonnet line and grille-less nose giving the car its popular wedge shape. The car went on sale in the US in July 1976 as a 1977 model, with a base price of $9,395. Porsche made small improvements to the 924 each model year between 1977 and 1985, but nothing major was changed on non-turbo cars. Turbo charged variants received many different, non-VW sourced parts, throughout the drive train, and when optioned with the M471 disc brake package and forged 16" wheels, the car was twice as expensive as a standard model.

While the car was praised for its styling, handling, fuel economy, and reliability, its available power became a point of criticism, as the US-spec engine only produced 95–110 hp. When the 924 Turbo models arrived, Car and Driver magazine said "Fast...at Last!" The later 924S had performance on par with the Turbo, but with much improved reliability, and at lower cost.

The 924 was discontinued in 1988, with Porsche marketing the 944 as its entry-level model.

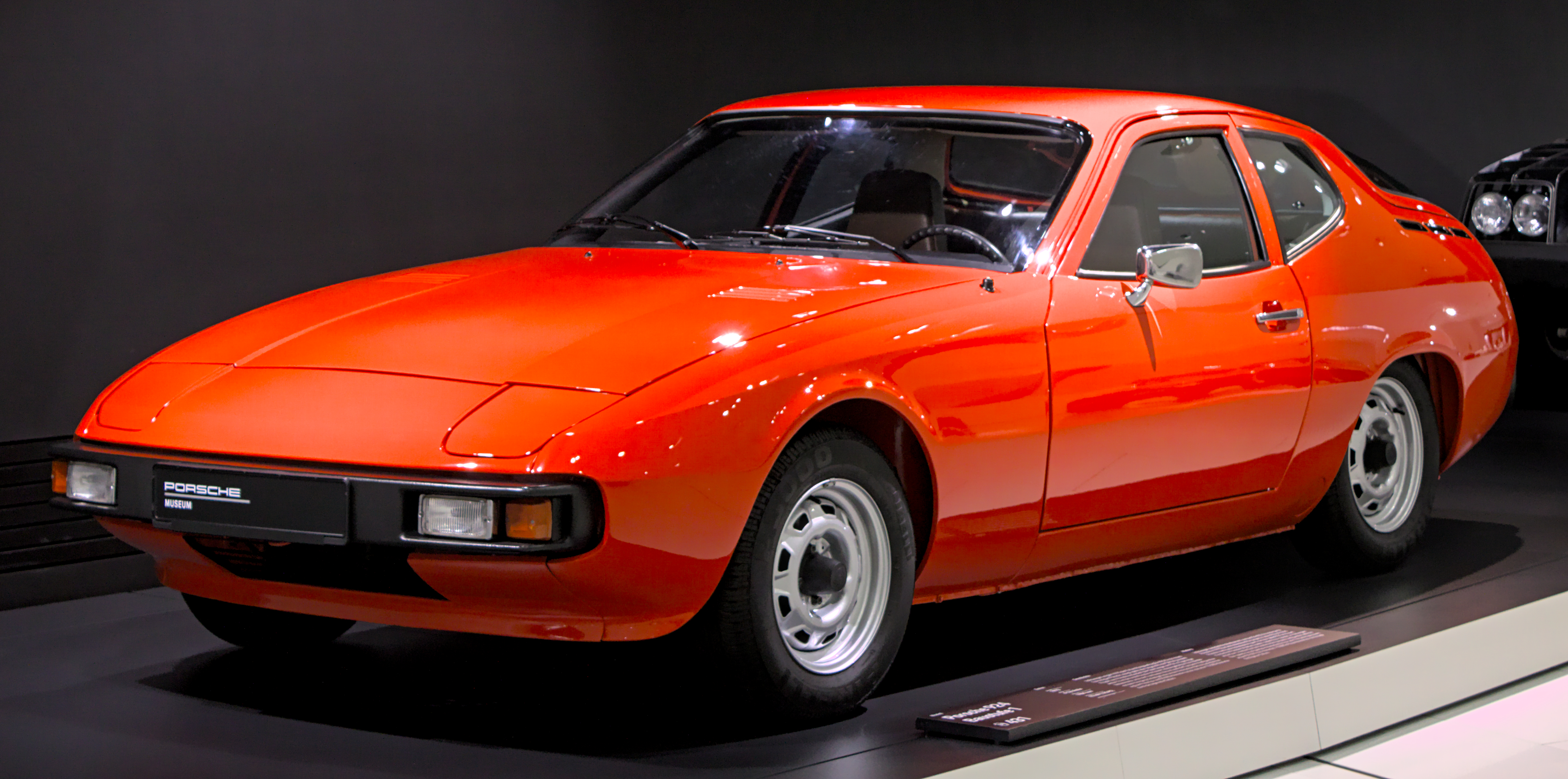
Porsche "Project 425"

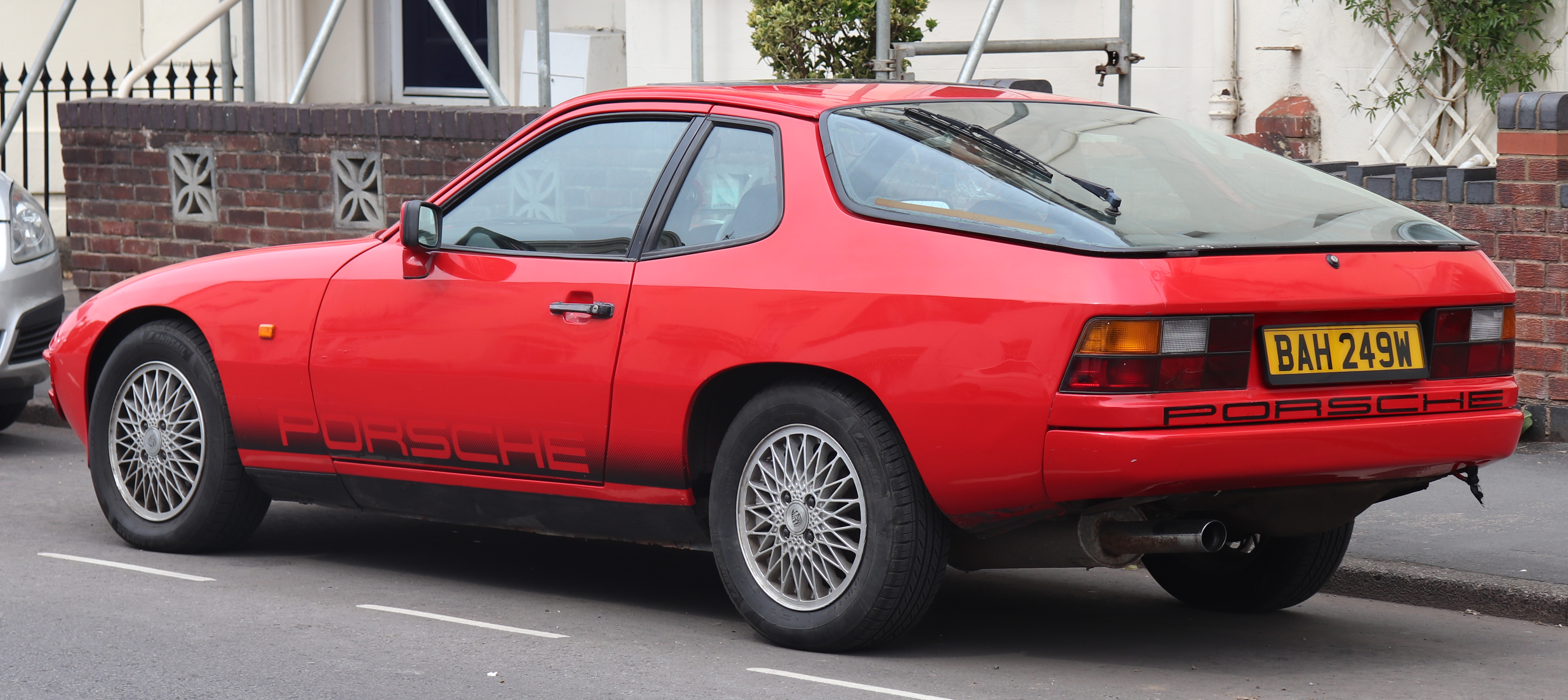
1981 Porsche 924 (UK) displaying thinner European-spec rear bumper and small wing-mounted side turn signal repeaters; no spoiler

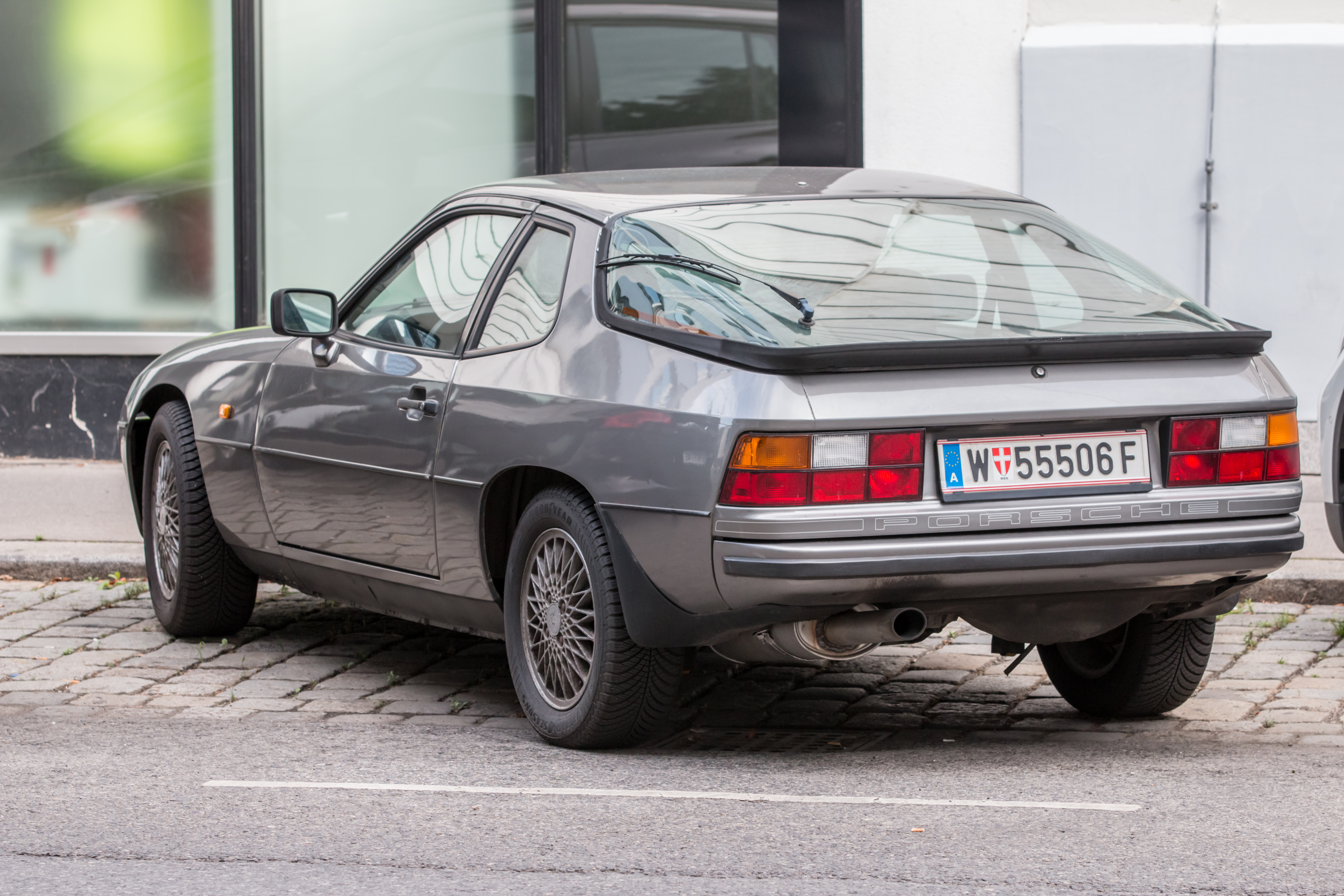
Rear view with optional spoiler

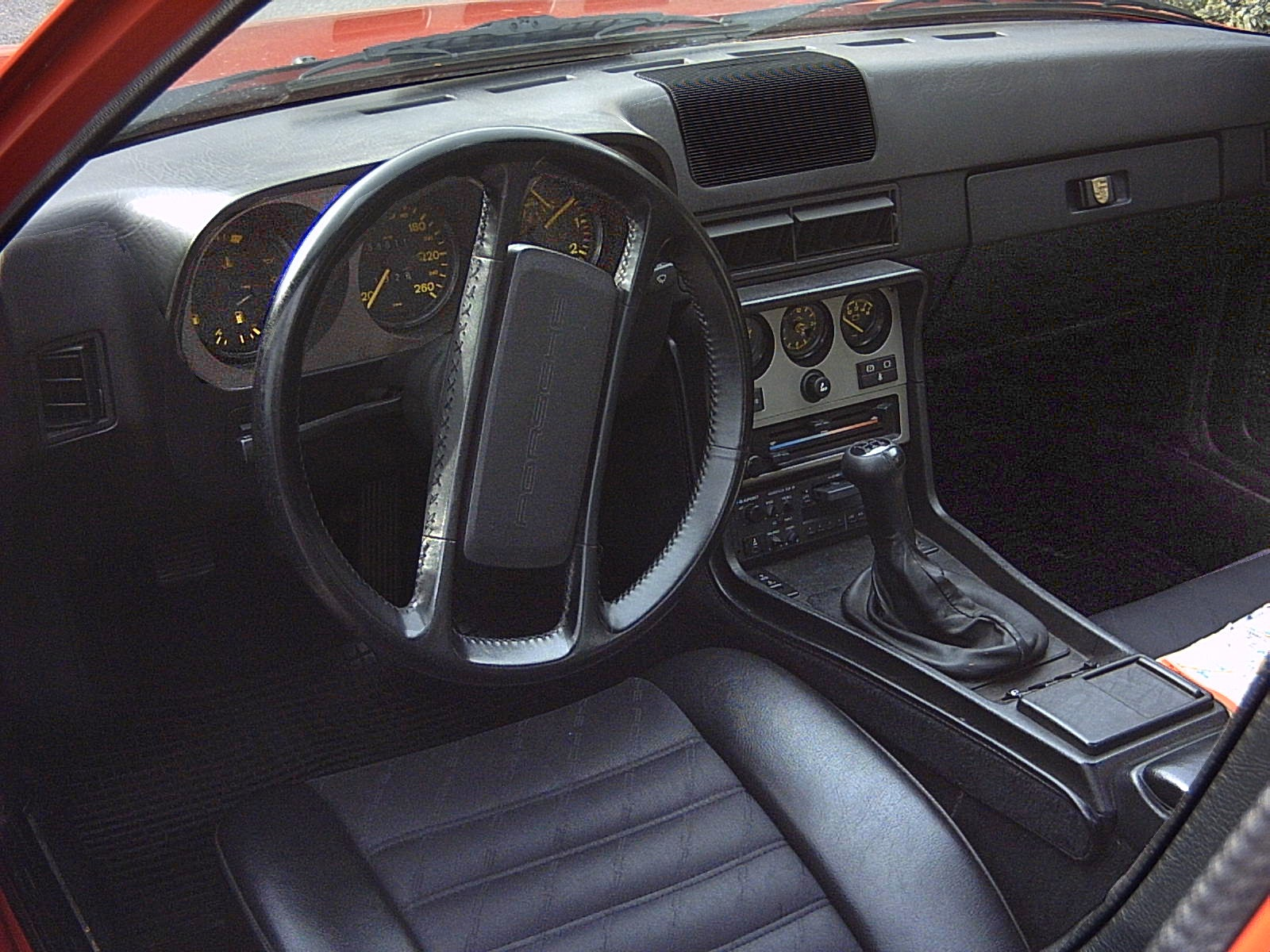
Interior (924S)

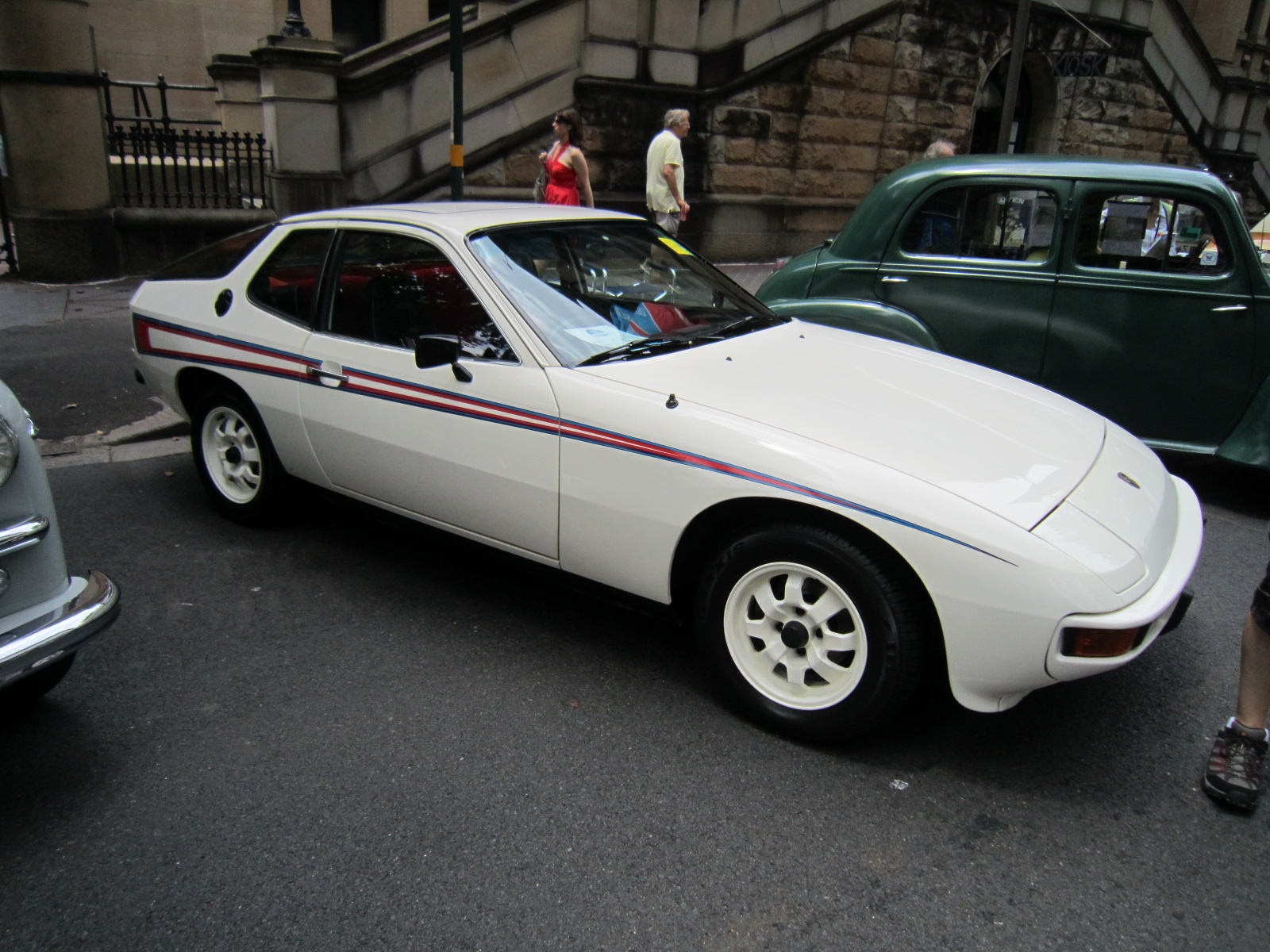
Porsche 924 Martini Championship Edition

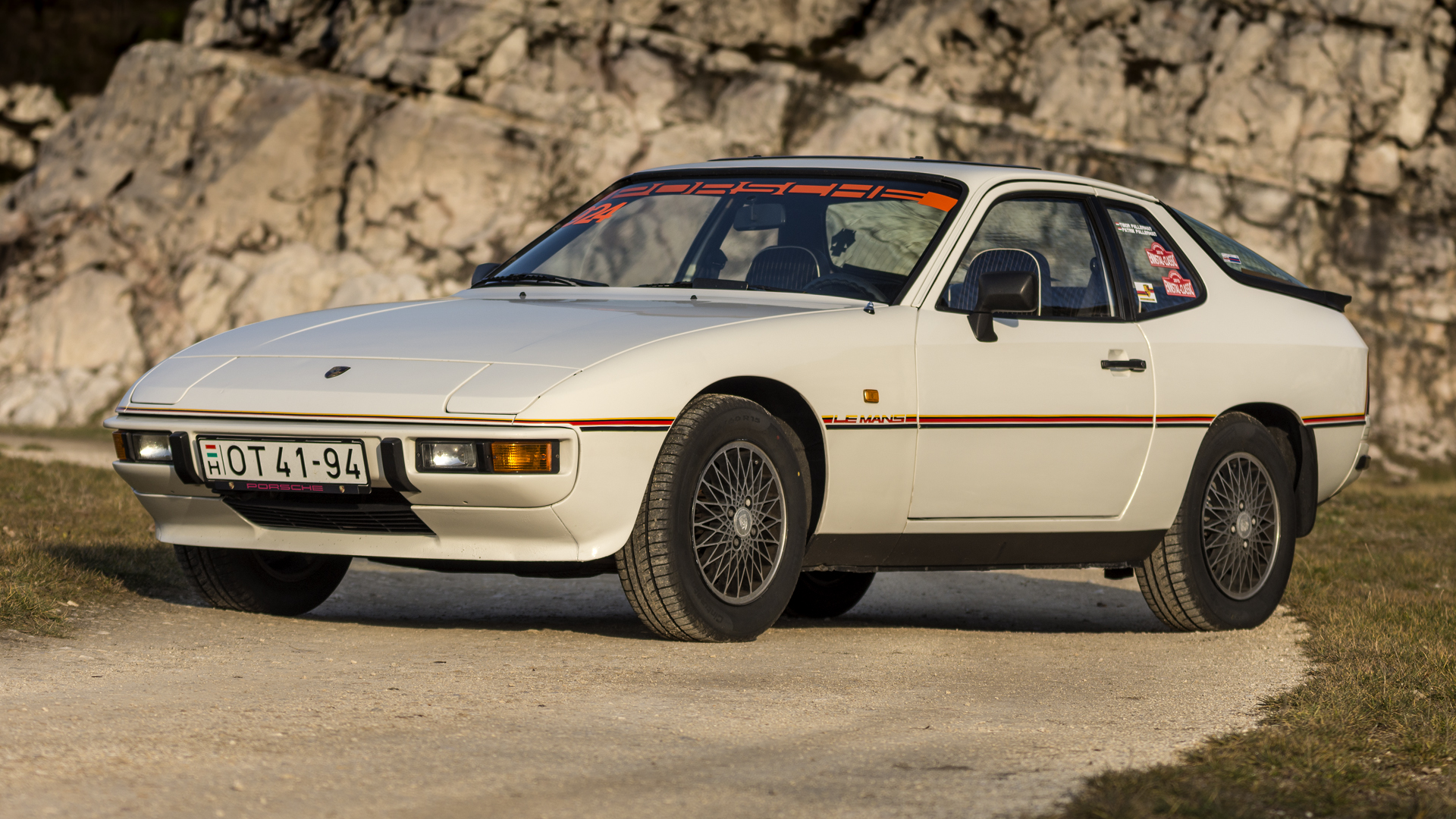
Porsche 924 Le Mans (1980 – Limited Edition) with European-spec front bumper featuring integral fog lights

== 924 Turbo ==
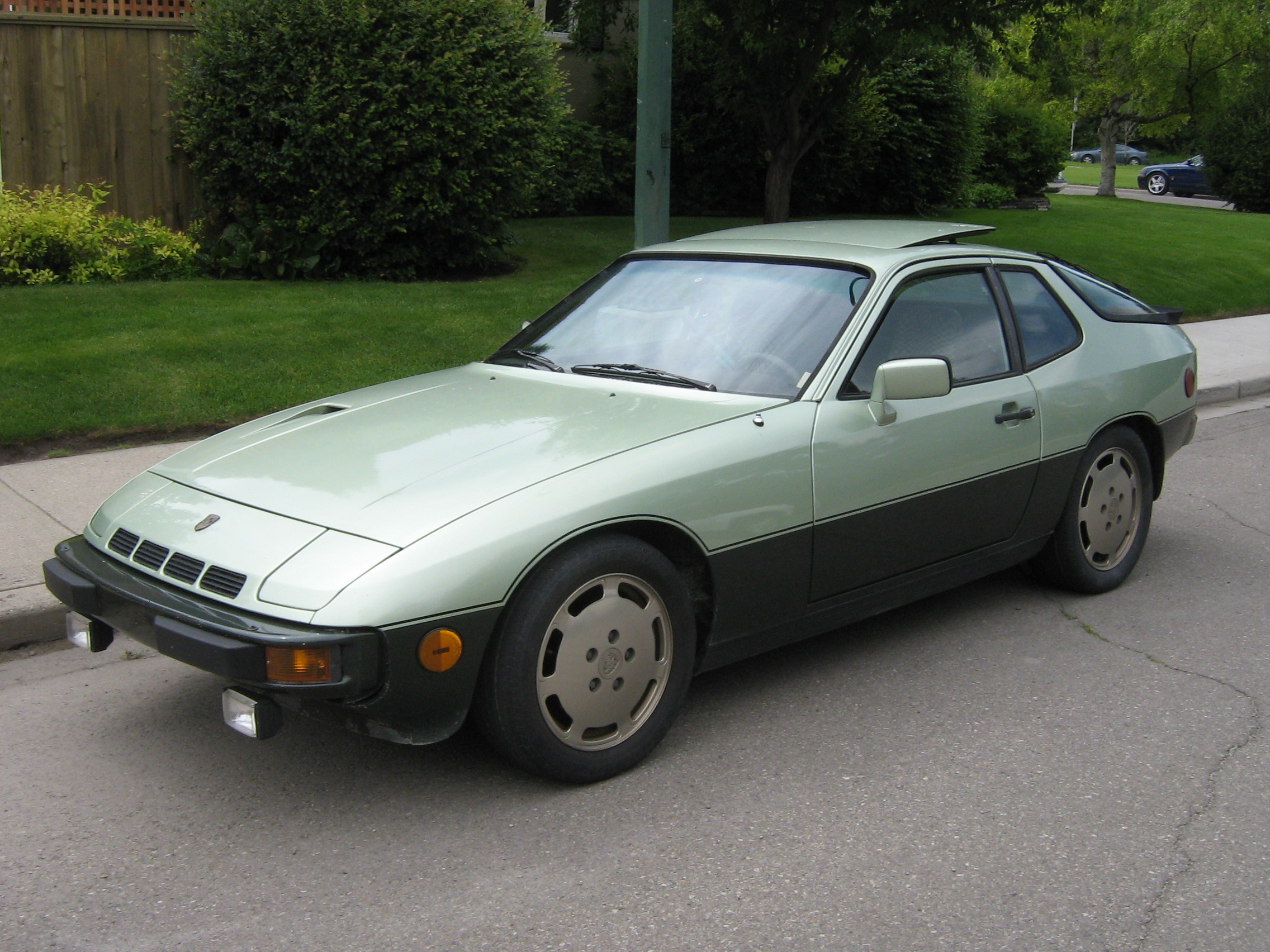
Porsche 924 Turbo (Canada). NACA duct and front fascia vents are typical of all Turbo models. Large round side-marker lights and prominent bumpers with separate fog lights are typical of all North American 924 models.

Porsche executives soon recognised the need for a higher-performance version of the 924 that could take advantage of the model's excellent balance and bridge the gap between the standard 924 and the 911. Having already found the benefits of turbochargers on several race cars and the 1975 911 Turbo (930), Porsche chose to use this technology for the 924, eventually introducing the 924 Turbo in 1978.

On release, the 924 Turbo was met with high praise from the automotive community and journalists alike. It was celebrated for its performance and handling, with build quality and more purposeful aesthetics garnering universal approval. Some criticised the turbocharged four-cylinder for its coarseness, but critics forgave it in exchange for its economy and remarkable power increase over the naturally-aspirated car. In their comparison against the Aston Martin V8, Porsche 928, Porsche 911 3.0SC, BMW 635 CSI and Lotus Éclat 523, Motor magazine found the 924 Turbo to be joint second in top speed (achieving an average of 142 mph) and second in 0-60 mph acceleration (achieving a time of 6.9 seconds), being topped only by the Aston V8 at 145 mph and Porsche 911 at 6.5 seconds, respectively, a remarkable feat considering the difference in displacement and price between the models.

To power the 924 Turbo, Porsche heavily revised the VW EA831 2.0 L I4 motor already used in the naturally aspirated 924, opting to hand assemble the engine at the Porsche factory in Zuffenhausen, Stuttgart. Porsche engineers designed and equipped it with a revised crankcase, connecting rods, cylinder-head gasket, crankshaft and a new aluminium-silicon alloy cylinder head. With the use of dished combustion chambers and specially shaped pistons, the compression ratio was reduced to 7.5:1, which helped better accommodate the KK&K K-26 turbocharger without inducing pre-ignition. Platinum tipped spark plugs were also used, and exhaust valve diameter was increased over the n/a engine. With 10 psi (69 kPa) of boost, output increased to 170 PS (125 kW) at 5,500 rpm and 245 N⋅m (181 lb⋅ft) of torque at 3,500 rpm. The 924 Turbo's engine assembly weighed about 29 kg (65 lb) more, so front spring rates and anti-roll bars were revised. Weight distribution was now 49/51 compared to the original 924 figure of 48/52 front to rear.

In order to aid cooling, as well as to distinguish it from the standard 924, Porsche added a NACA duct in the hood; this helped heat escape when stationary, and caused hot air to be drawn out of the engine compartment due to low pressure induced by the louvred alloy engine under-tray when on the move. In addition to the NACA duct, four slotted air vents were installed in the badge panel, with open ducts added to either side of the front valance to aid cooling of the front brakes. 15-inch spoke-style alloy wheels, four-wheel disc brakes with five-stud hubs, and a five-speed racing pattern "dog-leg" transmission was fitted as standard. Power was transferred from the clutch plate to the gearbox through a larger diameter torque tube. Forged 16-inch flat wheels of the style used on the 928 were optional, but fitment specification was that of the 911, which the 924 shared wheel offsets with. A rubber duck-tail spoiler was fitted to the rear hatch, reducing the already low drag coefficient from .36 to .33. Internally, Porsche called the 924 Turbo the "931", much like the 911 Carrera Turbo, which had been known as "Type 930". Although right hand drive specific parts were denoted by the prefix "932", both left hand drive and right hand drive cars are referred to as "931"; this designation remains in common use by Porsche enthusiasts today.

The turbocharged VW EA831 engine allowed the 924 Turbo to accelerate to 60 mph in a similar time to the early iterations of the bigger, more powerful Porsche 928, and 911 SC, 180 PS (132 kW), thanks in part to a lighter curb weight, but it also brought reliability problems as was often seen in other turbocharged cars of the era. This was mostly due to the fact that the general public did not know how to operate or care for such an early oil cooled turbo setup. Allowing the engine to idle and turbo to cool before shutdown helps prevent turbo seal and component failure and as such greatly extends the turbo's lifespan.

For the 1981 model year, Porsche released a revised 924 Turbo Series 2 (although badging still read "924 turbo"). By using a revised turbocharger with a larger compressor and a smaller turbine running at increased boost, slightly higher compression of 8:1 and an improved fuel injection system with DITC (Digital Ignition Timing Control) ignition triggered by the flywheel, peak power rose to 177 PS (130 kW).

In North America, the 924 Turbo arrived in late 1979 for the 1980 model year. It was saddled with extra weight compared to Euro-spec cars, due to the federally mandated large bumpers and other safety equipment, and less power due to stringent emissions controls. Power was 143 hp (107 kW), nearly twenty percent down on the European model. For the 1981 model year, power increased slightly to 154 hp (115 kW) and the transmission was switched to one with a regular H-pattern layout (North America only).

The 924 Turbo also saw success in motorsport, mainly in rally guise, preceding the introduction of the 924 Carrera GT. Between 1977 and 1980, Jürgen Barth and Roland Kussmaul headed a project to develop a competition specification 924 Turbo. The competition cars were based on prototype 931s purchased from the factory by Peter Falk, Porsche's head of motorsport. Modifications included but were not limited to a wider track, Rallye arches, and auxiliary light pods. The car first competed in the 1979 Monte Carlo Rally; with Barth and his co-driver Kussmaul at the helm, the car finished fourth in the GT4 class, despite being de-specced due to homologation requirements. The 1979 season continued with the same car and drivers taking part in the famous 19,000 km 1979 Round Australia Trial. Impressively, the car won its class, completing the trial with accumulated penalties of 13 hours and 9 minutes across the 134 stages.

The 1981 season saw the 924 Turbo make history when it carried a JVC camera inside the cabin, capturing the first ever in-car footage of the famous Monte Carlo Rally. This was its final season, retiring to make way for the intercooled 924 Carrera GT.

=== Carrera GT ===
In 1979, Porsche unveiled a concept version of the 924 at the Frankfurt Auto show wearing Carrera badges. A year later, in 1980, Porsche released the 924 Carrera GT, making clear their intention to enter the 924 in competition. By adding an intercooler, increasing compression to 8.5:1, and lowering the suspension, as well as various other little changes, Porsche was able to develop the 924 Turbo into the race car they had wanted, dubbing it the "924 Carrera GT". 406 examples (including prototypes) of the Carrera GT were built to qualify it for Group 4 racing requirements. Of the 400 roadgoing examples, 75 were made in right hand drive for the UK market. In 1981, Porsche released the limited production 924 Carrera GTS. 59 GTS models were built, all in left hand drive, with 15 of the 59 being race prepared Clubsport versions.

Visually, the Carrera GT differed from the standard 924 Turbo, in that it had polyurethane plastic front and rear flared guards, a polyurethane plastic front spoiler, a top mounted air scoop for the intercooler, a much larger rubber rear spoiler and a flush mounted front windscreen. It also featured Recaro seats with fine red pinstripes, and body paint was available in black, "Guards Red", and "Diamond Silver". It featured Pirelli P6 tires as standard, and Pirelli P7 tires were available as an option along with a limited slip differential. It lost the 924 Turbo's NACA duct in the hood, but retained the air intakes in the badge panel. This more aggressive styling was later used for as motivation for the 944. The later Carrera GTS differed stylistically from the GT with fixed headlamps under Perspex covers (instead of the GT's pop up units). GTS models were also 59 kg (130 lb) lighter than their GT counterparts at 1,121 kg (2,471 lb), and Clubsport versions were even lighter at 1,060 kg (2,337 lb).

In order to comply with the homologation regulations, the 924 Carrera GT and later 924 Carrera GTS were offered as road cars, producing 210 and 245 PS (154 and 180 kW) respectively. Clubsport versions of the GTS were also available with 270 PS (199 kW), and factory included Matter roll cage and race seats. 15 GTS Clubsport were built in total. 924 Carrera GT variations were known by model numbers 937 (left hand drive) and 938 (right hand drive).

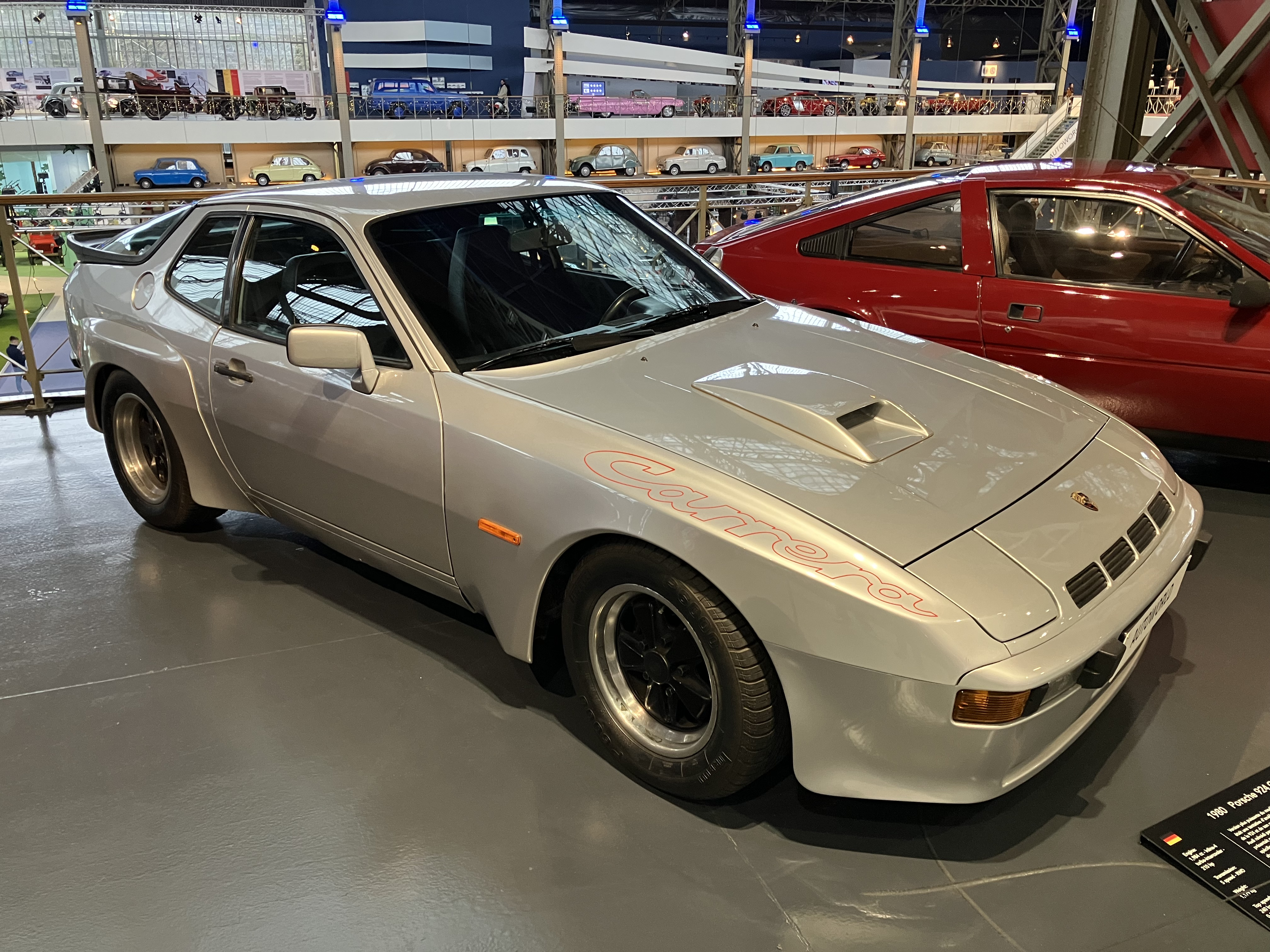
1980 924 Carrera GT

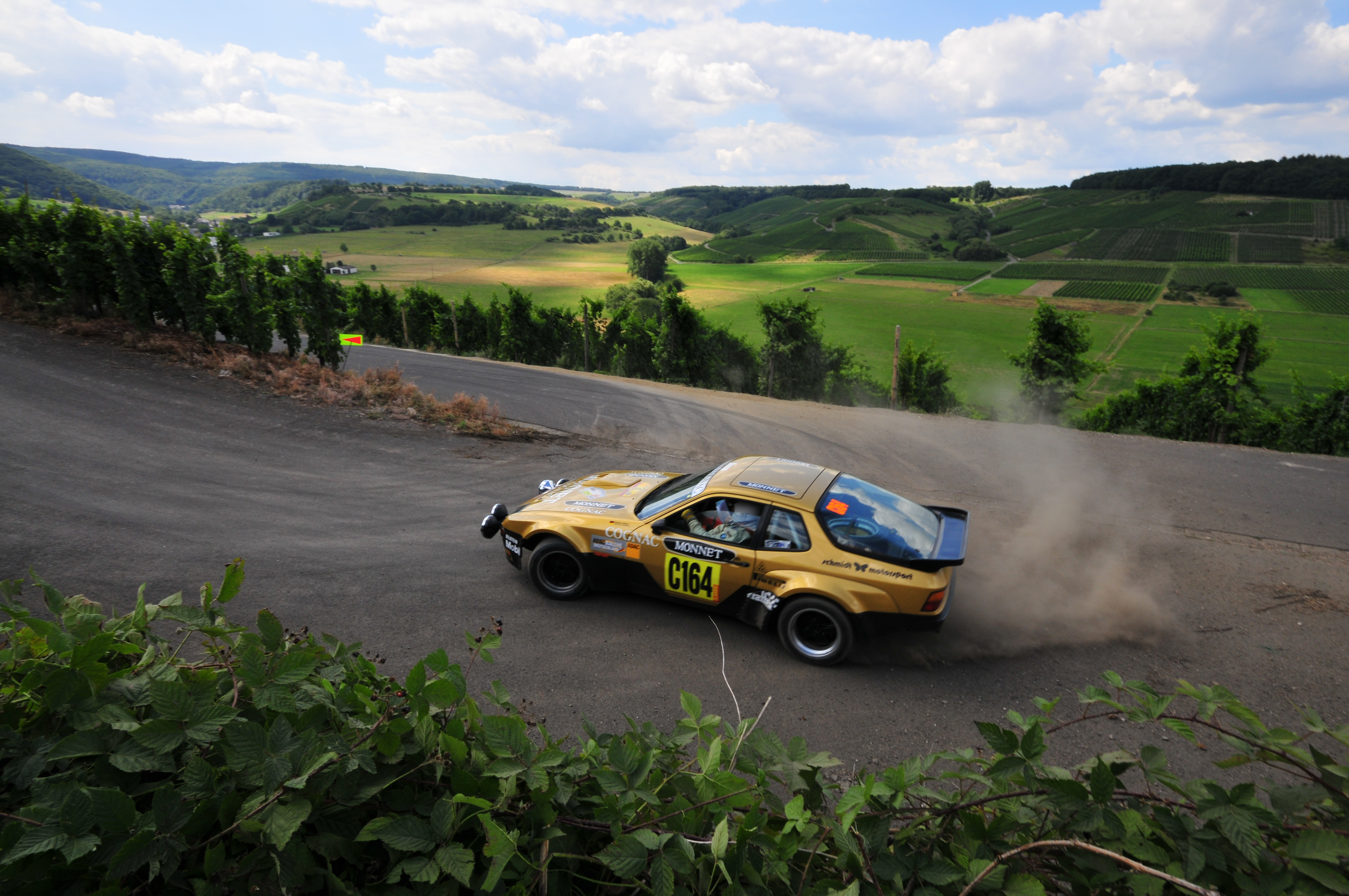
Walter Röhrl's 1981 924 Carrera GTS at the 2008 Rallye Deutschland

=== Carrera GTR ===
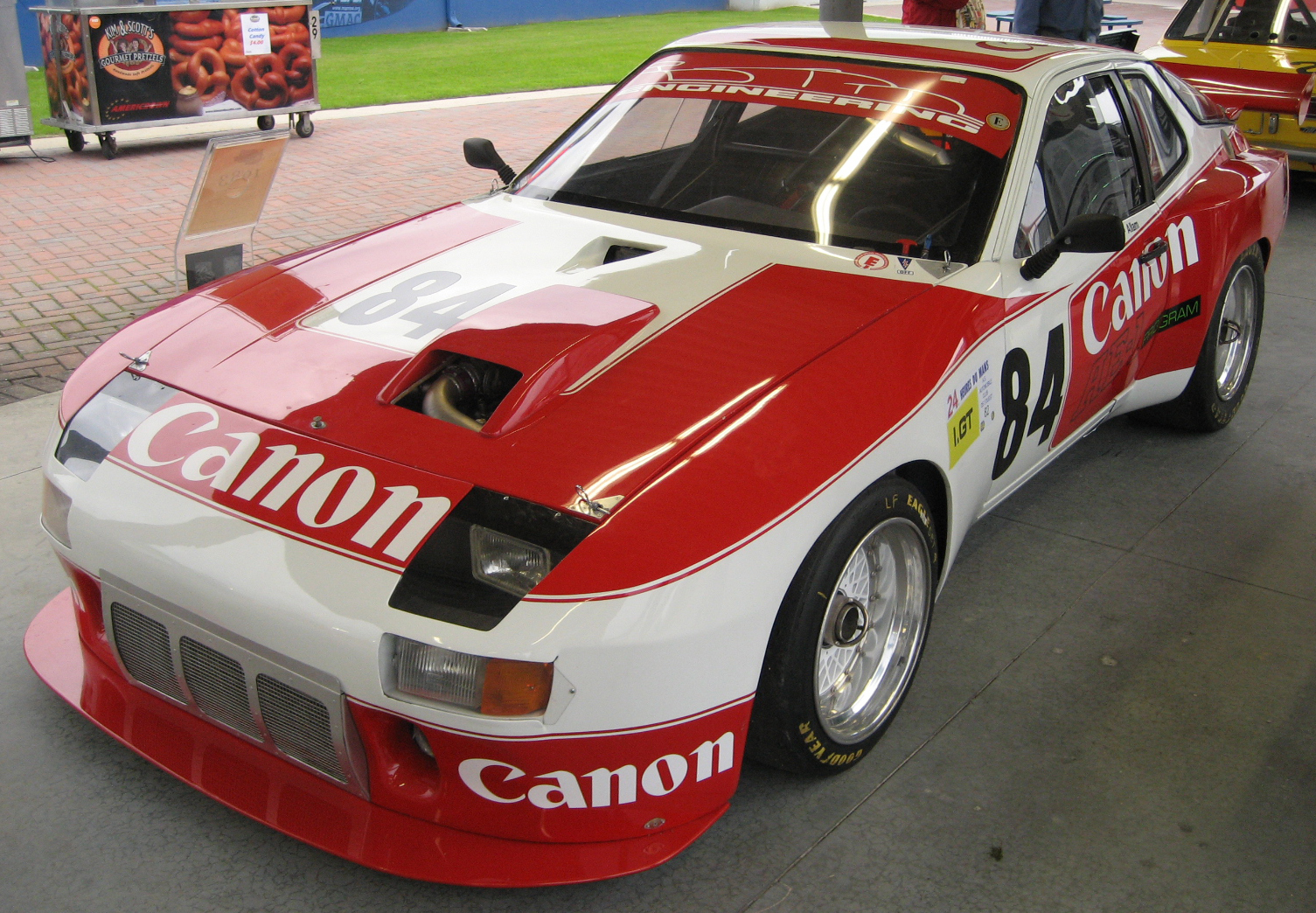
A 924 Carrera GTR campaigned by GTi Engineering in 1981 and 1982

The ultimate development of the 924 in its race trim was the 924 Carrera GTR race car, which produced 375 hp (280 kW; 380 PS) from a highly modified version of the 2.0-litre four used in all 924s, and weighed in at 930 kg (2,050 lb). This allowed for a 0–60 mph (97 km/h) time of 4.7 seconds and a top speed of 180 mph (290 km/h). In 1980, Porsche entered three 924 GTRs at the 24 Hours of Le Mans, which went on to finish sixth, 12th, and 13th overall, respectively. The company also built a 924GTR rally race car and two other GTRs (Miller and BF Goodrich). 17 fully assembled 924 GTRs were built, with chassis numbers 18 and 19 as spares for the private racing teams. A limited number of special series parts were produced to support the teams.

Lastly, in 1981, Porsche entered one of two specially built 924 Carrera GTPs (the "944GTP Le Mans") in which Porsche Motorsports introduced a new prototype highly modified 2.5 liter I4 engine. This engine sported four valves per cylinder, dual overhead camshafts, twin balance shafts and a single turbocharger K28 to produce 420 hp (313 kW; 426 PS). This last variant managed a seventh place finish overall, and spent the least time out of any other car in the pits. This new 2.5 liter configuration engine is the predecessor of the 944 platforms and the later 1987–88 944S 16V M44/40 power-plant.

Production of the 924 Turbo ceased in 1982 except for the Italian market, where it was sold until 1984. This was due to the restrictions on engines larger than two liters, putting the forthcoming 2.5 liter 944 into a much higher tax category.

== 924S ==
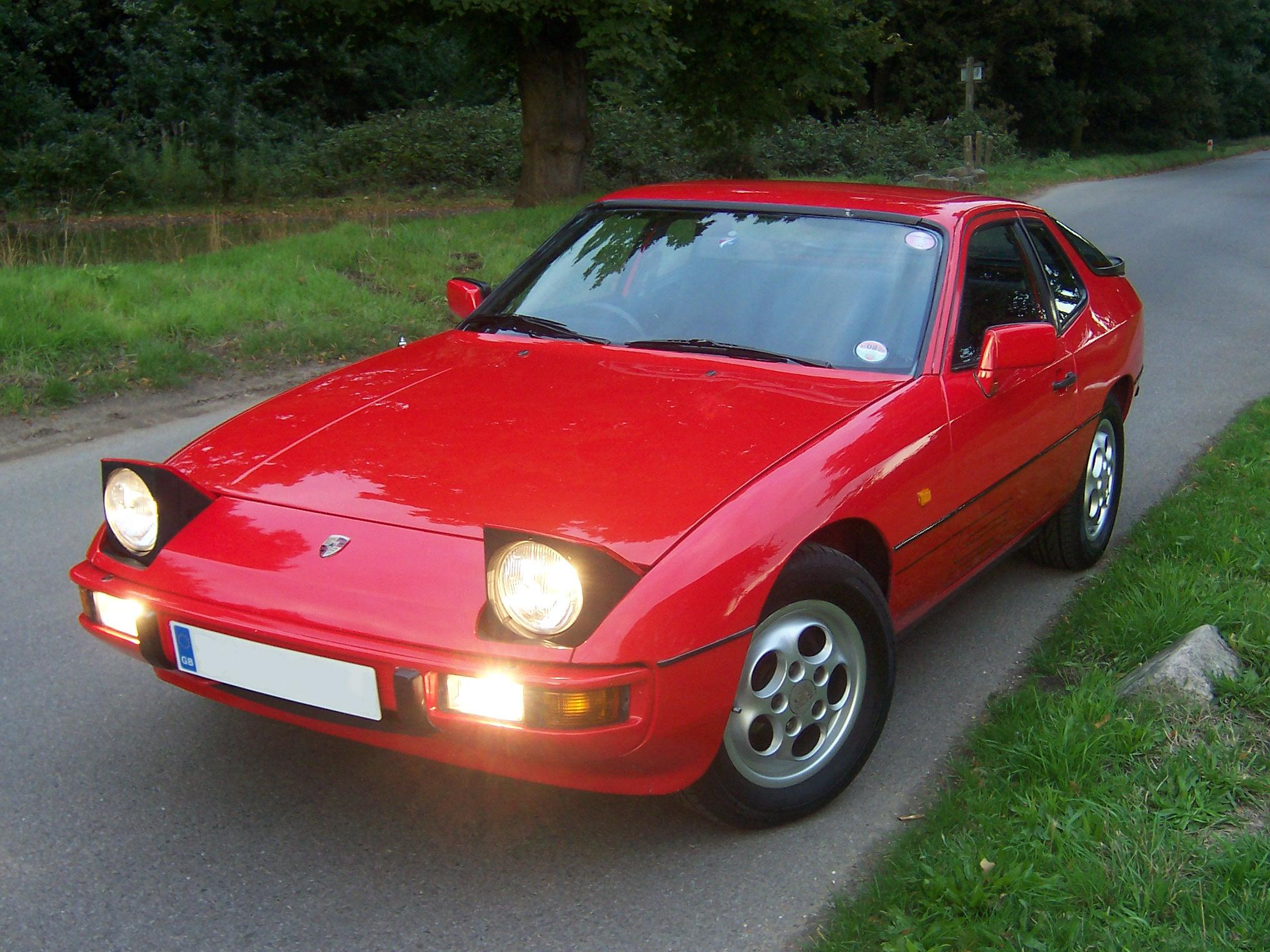
Porsche 924S in Guards Red

In 1984, Volkswagen decided to stop manufacturing the engine blocks used in the 2.0 L 924, leaving Porsche with a predicament. The 924 was considerably cheaper than its 944 stablemate, and dropping the model left Porsche without an affordable entry-level option. The decision was made to equip the narrower bodied 924 with a slightly detuned version of the 944's 163 bhp 2.5 litre straight four, upgrading the suspension and adding five-lug wheels and 944 style brakes, but retaining the 924's early interior. The result was 1986's 148 bhp 924S. Porsche also decided to re-introduce the 924 to the American market with an initial price tag of under $20,000.

In 1988, the 924S's final year of production, power increased to 158 PS (116 kW; 156 bhp), matching that of the previous year's Le Mans spec cars and the base model 944 (itself detuned by 3 PS (2 kW; 3 bhp) for 1988). This was achieved using different pistons which raised the S's compression ratio from 9.7:1 to 10.2:1, the knock-on effect being an increase in the octane rating, up from 91 RON to 95. This made the 924S slightly faster than the base 944 due to its lighter weight and more aerodynamic body. The 1988 model also gained three-point safety belts in the rear seats.

With unfavourable exchange rates in the late 1980s, Porsche decided to focus its efforts on its more upmarket models, dropping the 924S for 1989 and the base 944 later that same year.

== Motorsport ==
The 924 has its own racing series in the UK, run by the British Racing and Sports Car Club and the Porsche Racing Drivers Association. The Porsche 924 Championship was started in 1992 by Jeff May, who was championship coordinator until his death on 10 November 2003. Jeff May was also one of the founding members of Porsche Club Great Britain.

In the United States, the 924S is also eligible to race in the 944-Spec racing class.
