= Joseph Wagenbach =

Fictitious character

Joseph Wagenbach is a fictitious character created by German-Canadian visual artist Iris Haeussler. The original idea was conceived in 1999 as "Haus des Künstlers" (house of the artist) while the artist still lived in Europe. After her move to Canada, Haeussler began work on the actual production of the project, developing her character's biography and his psychological state of mind and then stepped into Wagenbach's shoes to create his oeuvre of over 100 sculptures and some few hundred sketches from the late period of his life. The house in which Wagenbach's work was installed was opened to the public for tours for several months in 2006, both before and after it was revealed Wagenbach was a fictional character.

== Installation ==
In summer 2006, a house was rented in downtown Toronto where the Wagenbach project was staged. Haeussler filled the house with furnishings, the ordinary detritus of an eccentric recluse's day-to-day life, several workshops and more than 100 sculptures, and uncounted drawings. Rhonda Corvese provided curatorial assistance to Haeussler. A fictitious institution called the "Municipal Archives" was established, ostensibly to assess the old man's legacy after he became incapacitated. The Municipal Archives organized guided tours through the house where visitors could not only see the chaotic accumulation of artworks but also get a glimpse into his daily life. The performative part of the installation – interactive tours by trained archivists – included such details as having visitors sign liability waivers and wear lab coats and gloves before entering the house. If the tour groups were small enough and sufficient time available, visitors were encouraged to open drawers and engage in conversations with the guides. These tours included viewing an old map of Germany where Wagenbach had marked his birthplace with an ‘X’ in pencil. As this village is only about 3 miles away from Bergen Belsen, a concentration camp during WWII, it was speculated that he might have witnessed cruelties there as a teenager or perhaps he had known an acquaintance or family member having been involved in guarding the camp, and that experience might have impacted his psyche and could have fueled his hermit habits and his art.

== Public and media response ==
Public reaction was largely positive, although not without controversy. Initially, the press reported the discovery of the Wagenbach house as literal fact. After the true nature of the project was revealed — first by an article in Toronto's National Post newspaper on 12 September 2006, next in a presentation at Toronto's Goethe Institute on 20 September, then at the Wagenbach house site itself as of 15 November 2006 — some media outlets expressed outrage when it was revealed that the whole project was a fiction. Some members of the public who had visited the installation were also upset to learn that Joseph Wagenbach had never existed.

== In other media ==
On 20 September 2006, a panel discussion accompanied by an exhibition of some of the pieces from the Wagenbach house was held at the Goethe Institute in Toronto. In 2007, a documentary film crew headed by Peter Lynch visited the Toronto house, collecting on-site- footage for his planned movie “The Archivists Handbook”. In 2009, SPECS journal of art and culture, a journal of art criticism, published a survey of fictional-persona art projects which featured the Wagenbach house.

== See also ==
Conceptual art
Installation art
Superfiction
Fictive art
