= Arnaldo Morales =

Puerto Rican installation artist

- Born: 1967 (age 58–59); Ponce, Puerto Rico
- Education: Escuela de Artes Plásticas
- Website: ArnaldoMorales.com

Arnaldo Morales (born 1967) is a Puerto Rico-born, New York-based artist who creates interactive, mechanical sculptures using recycled and fabricated industrial materials.

== Early life and education ==
Morales was born in Ponce, Puerto Rico in 1967. He received his B.A. from Escuela de Artes Plásticas, San Juan, Puerto Rico, in 1994. He moved to New York in 1996.

== Career ==
Morales’s work combines found, recycled elements from the waste of aviation, motor sports, household items, the medical industry, public transportation, prisons, pools, playgrounds and other sources with carefully detailed fabricated parts. He creates floor, wall, or ceiling-mounted sculptures (and at times, large-scale public commissions or strap-on, wearable objects) that are activated by viewers. Electric motors, air compressors, pneumatics, and other mechanical systems power their kinetic activity, which is often experienced by viewers as intimidating and dangerous but also exciting. His "Animal Instinct" series, for example, consists of sculptures that reference zoomorphic response mechanisms.

Once activated, the works can be seen as darkly ironic commentaries on the fears, ambitions, aggressions, and sexual desires of our current age. Curator Franklin Sirmans writes of Morales’s sculpture, “Although a work may initially look malignant, there is a humor in their finished form and new functionality.” Cultural critic and curator Carlos McCormick writes, “The beast he breeds is in fact a hybrid, a mutant mutt that is in part an atavistic regression back to visceral power and visceral potency of the machine, and also very much a part of the current situation in which the vestiges of the industrial epoch have become an arcane future.” Writer and curator Linda Weintraub describes his work as "formally elegant, meticulously crafted, cleverly conceived, and mischievously aggressive."

Morales was included by the critic Manuel Alvarez Lezama among a group of Puerto Rican artists that he singled out as “Los Novísimos” (The Newest Ones). Lezama considers this group of Puerto Rican artists, who came of artistic age in the 1990s, as notable for their infusion of provocative work into the contemporary Puerto Rican art scene. The importance of Puerto Rican artists of this generation is, as museum director Silvia Karman Cubiña writes, "their social dimension and the potential for interaction with others."

Morales's work has appeared in galleries and museums in the United States, Puerto Rico, Europe, and Mexico, including the Museum of Arts and Design (New York), the Kunsthalle Winterthur (Switzerland), the Museo d’Arte Provincia di Nuoro (Sardinia, Italy), the Museu de les Ciències Príncipe Felipe (Valencia, Spain), MoMA PS1 (New York), the Centro Cultural de Arte Contemporánea, (Mexico), and The Living Art Museum (Reykjavik, Iceland). His work is included in private collections across the United States and Puerto Rico, as well as the permanent collections of Museo de Arte de Puerto Rico, Museo de Arte Contemporánea, and Museo de la Universidad de Puerto Rico (all in San Juan); El Museo del Barrio and Chase Manhattan Bank (New York); and the John Michael Kohler Arts Center (Sheboygan, WI). His work has been supported by residencies and fellowships from the Islip Art Museum, the Jerome Foundation, the New York Foundation for the Arts, and other institutions.

He is an Associate of the Los Angeles-based Institute of Cultural Inquiry. He is married to curator Deborah Cullen.
