= Parafiction =

Parafiction refers to a fictional person, place, thing, or event that is presented as fact, and invested, temporarily or partially, with belief. The term is typically used in art, art history and criticism, theater, and film studies. According to the 2009 October magazine article that first theorized the term, it is not related to an earlier use of the term in 1970s literary criticism, but does link conceptually to the "paratheatrical experiments" of Jerzy Grotowski.

== Contemporary Art ==
In contemporary art contexts, parafiction is typically categorized as performance or installation art, but often involves work in other mediums, including graphic design, sculpture, painting, digital art, and photography. For example, The Fae Richards Photo Archive (1996) is a collection of photographic prints exhibited in a museum vitrine. They appear to have been taken throughout the adult life of the twentieth-century actress and singer whose life they document. In fact they were all staged, photographed, and carefully aged by artist Zoe Leonard in collaboration with filmmaker Cheryl Dunye, and Fae Richards is a fictional character Dunye created in her film Watermelon Woman to represent the many unknown Black women artists whose archives were not preserved for history.

Art historian Keren Goldberg explains that "it is crucial to distinguish between fictional and parafictional characters. While the former remain within their confined artistic bubbles and their fictive status is well known, the latter are perceived by certain spectators, and for different periods, as real people." Parafiction is therefore experienced as a kind of reality glitch, or epistemic shift, which is crucial to its critical function. In the "Fae Richards" example discussed above, for example, there is what art historian Jennifer Gonzalez called a "missing persons" effect, in which the audience's investment in the character makes the historical reality of lives like theirs palpable, but discovering that the character was fictional ensures that the injustice in who is and isn't remembered by history is also felt, as a loss.

Parafiction can also take the form of imposture, as when artist-activists pretend to be representatives of a corporation or other entity they want to critique (see The Yes Men, who typically introduced a new product or campaign in the target's name that humorously exaggerated the tendencies of neoliberal capitalism they believed the target exemplified). In a particularly elaborate parafiction, German-Canadian artist Iris Häussler created a full-blown archaeological investigation in progress, in a 19th-century home that is now part of the Art Institute of Ontario. Visitors took guided tours of the dig, and learned about archaeological process as well as the story of a housemaid whose deposits of mysterious wax and clay objects behind walls and beneath the floors the excavation had uncovered (all made by Häussler as well). Most only discovered the fiction when reading the "Excavation Notes" document handed out at the end of the tour. (He Named Her Amber, 2008)

== Historical Context ==
Carrie Lambert-Beatty, the art historian who introduced the term in a 2009 essay, has said that in its "strong" form, parafiction sharply dropped off around 2014, amid the full-blown crisis of disinformation, "fake news," and post-truth politics, arguably anticipated by these artists .

== Precedents ==
Important precedents for historicizing parafiction include Augusto Boal's Invisible Theater; Jerzi Grotowski's paratheater; media interventions like Happening para un jabalí difunto (Happening for a Dead Boar) (1966), and the interventionist work of Joey Skaggs from the late 1960s to the present.

== Related Concepts ==
- fictive art
- parafact
- fictioning
- epistemic friction
- trompe l'oeil
- subversive affirmation
- overidentification
- culture jamming

== Artists ==
Most artists don't work in parafiction exclusively. Artists known for at least one parafictional work include:

- damali ayo
- Michael Blum
- Katarina Burin
- Cheryl Dunye and Zoe Leonard
- Joan Fontcuberta
- Coco Fusco and Guillermo Gómez-Peña
- Theaster Gates
- Iris Häussler
- Pierre Huyghe
- Beauvais Lyons
- Eva and Franco Mattes
- Walid Raad
- Roee Rosen
- Lytle Shaw
- Christoph Schlingensief
- Aliza Schvarts
- Joey Skaggs
- Fred Wilson
- The Yes Men
