= Norman Daly =

American artist

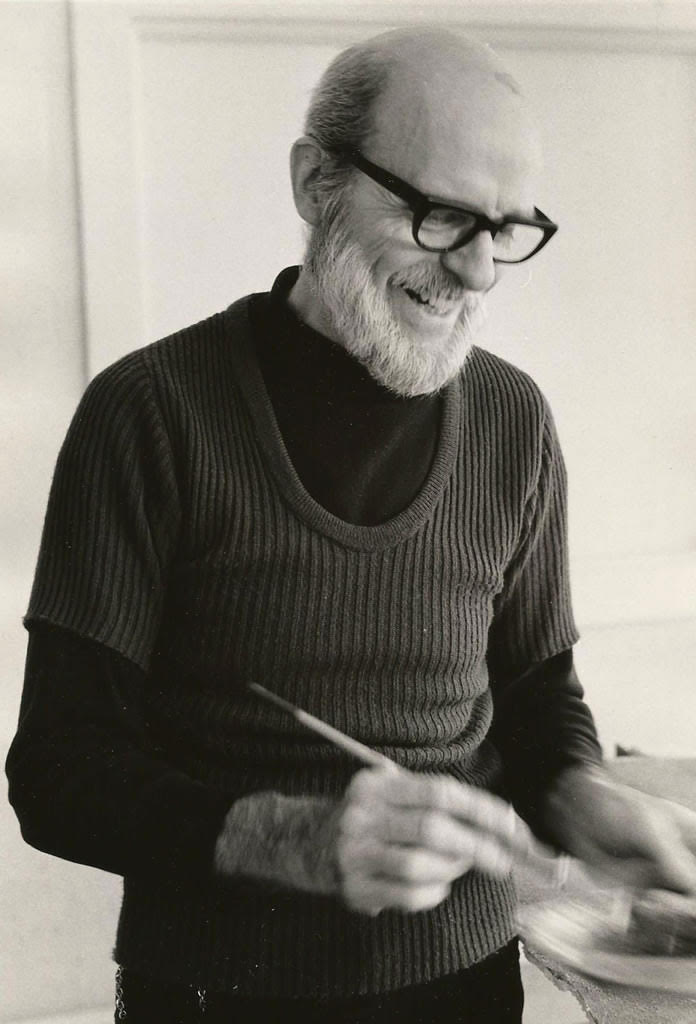
- Born: August 9, 1911; Pittsburgh, Pennsylvania
- Died: April 2, 2008 (aged 96); Ithaca, New York
- Education: New York University Institute of Fine Arts (1941-1942); Ohio State University (MA 1940); Fellowship in Paris (1937–38); University of Colorado (BFA 1937); Carnegie Institute of Technology (1932-34)
- Employer: Cornell University
- Known for: Fictive Art; Painting; Found Objects; Assemblage; Sculpture
- Notable work: The Civilization of Llhuros
- Spouse: Helen Gebbie
- Children: David and Nicholas Daly
- Website: https://normandalyart.org/

Norman D. Daly (August 9, 1911 - April 2, 2008), was an American artist who created the fictional Civilization of Llhuros along with hundreds of its artifacts, texts, and soundscapes. His work on The Civilization of Llhuros starting in the mid-1960s makes him the pioneering practitioner of an art genre now known as fictive archaeology.

== Family and education ==
Daly was born and raised in Pittsburgh, Pennsylvania, the youngest of seven children of Rose (Owens) Daly and James A. Daly. His elementary and secondary education combined elements of the Catholic and the secular (Schenley High School). He showed an early aptitude for art and was a night school art student at the Carnegie Institute of Technology (1932–34) before going on to major in art at the University of Colorado (BFA 1937). After a fellowship year in Paris (1937–38), he received his MA in art history from Ohio State University (1940). His first teaching position was at Oberlin College (1940–41). Daly also undertook post-graduate work in art history at The Institute of Fine Arts, New York University while teaching at Douglass College.

Daly married Helen O. Gebbie in 1942, and they had two sons, David and Nicholas.

== Paintings and sculpture ==
In 1942, Daly joined the Department of Art at Cornell University in Ithaca, New York, where he taught drawing, painting, materials and methods, and elements of design. He became Professor of Art in 1958 and reached the mandatory retirement age in 1976, but was able to continue teaching as an emeritus professor until 1999.

Beginning with his undergraduate years in Boulder, Norman Daly took inspiration for his early paintings from the American Southwest and Native American art. He began exhibiting these paintings in the New York City gallery world in mid-1940s, and his work as a professional artist continued throughout the 1950s. By 1960 his interests broadened to the three-dimensional, which included found objects, assemblages and marble carvings. These new interests paved the way for the creation of The Civilization of Llhuros.

Daly's modernist paintings from the mid to late1940s are most recently represented in the collections of Asheville Art Museum (NC), Rollins Museum of Art (FL), Boca Raton Museum of Art (FL), Mattatuck Museum (CT), Fairfield University Art Museum (CT), Dennos Museum Center (MI) among others.

== The Civilization of Llhuros ==
Daly became interested in the relationship of art to anthropology and archaeology, and this new approach led him to create the imaginary civilization of Llhuros. He situated Llhuros in Asia Minor just east of the Iron Age kingdom of Lydia (now western Turkey). The Civilization of Llhuros is the title for the collection that Daly went on to present as archaeological artifacts of Llhuros. Included are frescoes, architectural fragments, vessels, ritual objects, jewelry, games, a mosaic and musical and scientific instruments. Llhuros is composed of more than 150 works of visual art, ranging from a matchbox-size scientific instrument to an 8' by 36' temple wall in bas-relief.

Daly also created works of Llhuroscian poetry and collaborated with musicians and actors in the studios of inventor Robert Moog to record Llhuroscian music. Finally, Daly invented an elaborate world of scholars and commentators who voiced their opinions on many aspects of Llhuros. In 1972, the Andrew Dickson White Museum of Art at Cornell, under the direction of Thomas Leavitt, mounted the first exhibition of The Civilization of Llhuros. The exhibition catalog appears to be the catalog of an archaeological exhibition, with illustrations and detailed technical and historical information. This combination of an invented archaeology together with skillful efforts to make the project appear to be actual history marks The Civilization of Llhuros as an exemplar of fictive art (also known as superfiction).

A witty aspect of the exhibitions is that many of the "artifacts" on display were patently objects from modern times, painstakingly resurfaced by Daly to look like Llhuroscian artifacts. A reviewer for Newsweek magazine reported:

Daly's ingenuity and his skill at "corroding" surfaces by the application of acrylic paints turns a stove-lid holder from an old gas range into an "Early Archaic" sculpture of a "pair of fornicating gods." Close inspection of a "photograph of a Pruii Bird" ("similar to the sooty-footed humming-birds of Llhuros") reveals the inverted faces of two astronauts in a space capsule. A "Portrait of a Man," from the "Decline Period," is actually a "bronzed" plastic figurine of baseball great Honus Wagner. A set of "bronze' doors with bas-relief was contrived from packing boxes for a Honda motorcycle.

Many passages in the exhibition catalog are likewise clearly meant to be funny. Daly felt that his art was serious in character but that the humor played a part in it; he told an interviewer:

Llhuros is here and now - a recasting of my 60 years of experience ... You know, people won't listen if you talk to them seriously. My show is like that Pennsylvania Dutch expression 'half in jest and all in earnest.

The Civilization of Llhuros was widely exhibited in the United States in the early 1970s. It received its largest presentation, as part of Projekt '74, at the Roman-Germanic Museum in Cologne in 1974. After 1974, Daly moved on to other projects. Significant aspects of Llhuros were again shown at the Herbert F. Johnson Museum at Cornell in 2004. Llhuros experienced a renaissance beginning in 2017 when a sampling of objects was included in the Plurivers exhibition at La Panacée in Montpellier, France. Following that, in 2019 a full installation of "The Civilization of Llhuros" was featured at the Istanbul Biennial. Both exhibitions were under the direction of the renowned French curator and critic Nicolas Bourriaud.

In 2021, Antoinette LaFarge, a fictive practitioner herself, published Sting in the Tale: Art, Hoax and Provocation. In this study, LaFarge described Llhuros as the prototype of the genre of fictive art. To mark the 50th anniversary of The Civilization of Llhuros, the 2022 Llhuros Symposium was hosted by the University of Tennessee Knoxville School of Art under the direction of Chancellor's Professor Beauvais Lyons. Fifteen international artists and scholars presented work during this online virtual event. The Cornell University Archives holds the Norman Daly Papers which focus prominently on Llhuros.

In January 2026, the 150+ artifacts which comprise The Civilization of Llhuros were acquired by Cornell University, specifically the Anthropology Collaboratory, where the collection will be accessible to faculty, students and researchers. The websites and online catalog inventory will continue to be maintained by Norman Daly Art for the near future.
