= Jan D'Esopo =

Puerto Rican painter

Jan D'Esopo (born c. 1934) is a painter and sculptor, mainly active in Puerto Rico.

== Early years ==
D'Esopo (birth name: Janet D'Esopo) was born in New York City. Her father Joe D'Esopo, a second generation Italian, was a doctor and a teacher at Yale University; her mother Marion was a psychiatric nurse of Scottish background. The family later moved to Hartford, Connecticut where D'Esopo received their primary and secondary education. In 1943, at the age of nine, Jan won various awards in painting at an exhibition held at the Wadsworth Atheneum. D'Esopo spent some summer vacations in Puerto Rico, where her uncle used to work for Puerto Rican governor Luis Muñoz Marín.

In 1956, she enrolled and attended Bennington College in Vermont. She graduated with majors in painting and sculpture. She also studied at the Yale School of Fine Arts.

== Art work ==
In 1961, D'Esopo and her husband purchased an eighteenth-century Spanish colonial house located on Norzagaray Street in Old San Juan. The couple restored the house, which is now known as "The Gallery Inn", and converted it into a gallery, studio, and boutique hotel. In the gallery, D'Esopo exhibits her works of art and sculptures.

D'Esopo developed her own unique style of watercolor painting and in 1985 her paintings were exhibited, with that of other artists from around the world, at the Bronx Museum of the Arts. Her bronze monuments are exhibited in front of the Capitol Building of Puerto Rico and other public and private buildings.

D'Esopo taught watercolor at the Art Students League in San Juan and founded two art galleries to encourage and promote young artists. She also organized workshops together with her sister Teresa, who is a portrait artist.

Among the publications which have written articles or published the art works of D'Esopo are: The New York Times, Vogue, The Wall Street Journal, The Washington Post, Chicago Daily News, Colonial Homes, Country Inns, Travel & Leisure, and The American Way Magazine. She has also recorded two educational videos, Landscape Painting: Old San Juan and Bronze is Her Passion.

== See also ==
- List of Puerto Rican artists
