= Jan Harrison =

American painter and sculptor

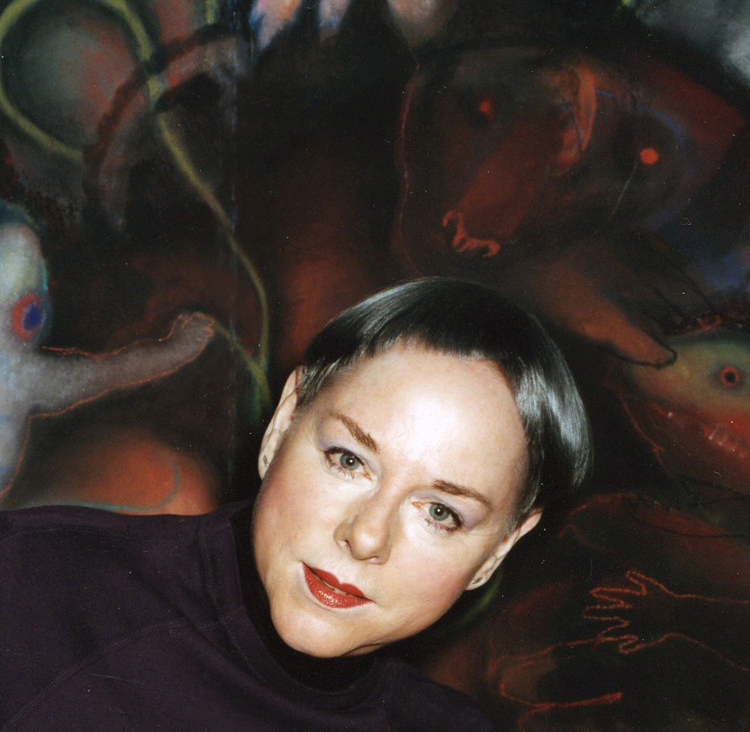
Photo by Marlis Momber

Jan Harrison (born December 18, 1944, in West Palm Beach, Florida) is an American painter and sculptor whose work, which primarily features animal imagery, centers on the animal soul, consciousness and voice as they relate to human existence and the collective psyche. Her art is informed by the philosophy of deep ecology, and a monograph detailing her work describes it as “excavat(ing) the arcane kingdom of the human psyche, so long tyrannized by the repressive and oppressive forces of socialization." She has exhibited widely in the United States and abroad, and her work is featured in In The Making: Creative Options for Contemporary Art. Harrison speaks and sings in a language of vocables, "Animal Tongues," which she performs with her visual art. She has received six grants in the arts, and is the Inaugural Recipient of the Recharge Foundation Fellowship for New Surrealist Art, New York Foundation for the Arts, NYFA, 2019. She currently lives and works in New York’s Hudson Valley.

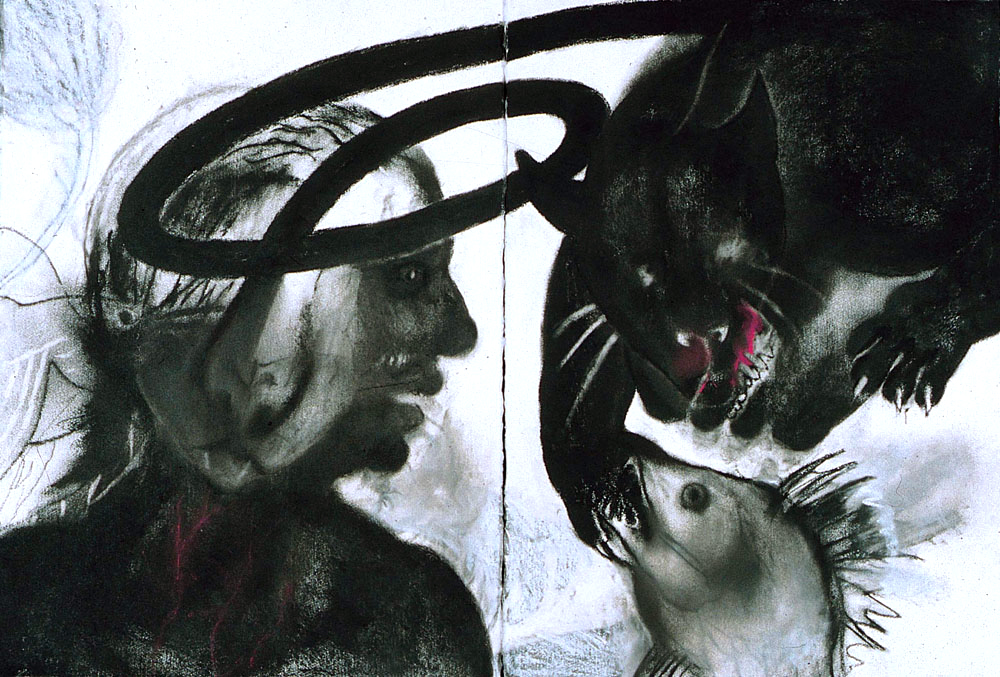
"Now You See Me" by Jan Harrison, 1996

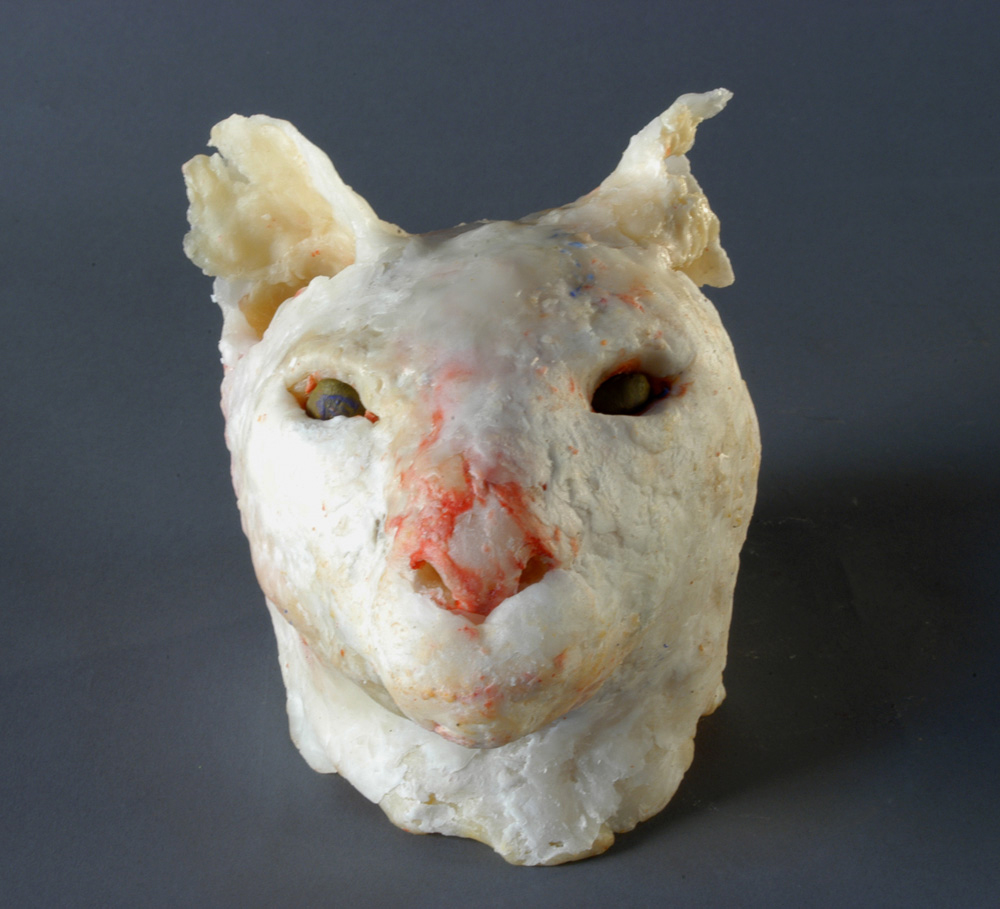
"Cat with Raw Nose" by Jan Harrison, 2007

== Select bibliography ==
- Arcana Mundi: Selected Works 1979-2000, Jan Harrison and Linda Weintraub, Barrytown, Ltd. (2000)
- “Internal Sources of Inspiration: Soul-Genus Fusion,” in In The Making: Creative Options for Contemporary Art, Linda Weintraub, d.a.p./Distributed Art Publishers, Inc. (2003)
- "Singing in Animal Tongues: An Inner Journey," Jan Harrison, Performing Arts Journal, 97:28-38 (2011)

== Select reviews ==
- "Jan Harrison's Dream Animals" Carter Ratcliff, Hyperallergic (October 3, 2020)
- "Jan Harrison's thoroughly modern surrealism" Lynn Woods, Hudson Valley One (November 26, 2019)
- "Life or Death" by Brainard Carey, Praxis (January 19, 2018)
- “Crossing Over to Jan Harrison,” George Quasha,, (2001)
- “Jan Harrison: Myths for Our Time,” Ann Pollak, Dialogue Magazine, (May 1989)
- “Jan Harrison, Audrey Skoudas: Ten Solo Exhibitions, Wright State University Gallery,” Elizabeth Hoxie, New Art Examiner (April 1982)
