= Deborah Cullen =

Deborah Cullen-Morales
- Born: U.S.
- Other names: Deborah Cullen
- Education: Graduate Center of the City University of New York (PhD)
- Occupations: Curator, museum director
- Spouse: Arnaldo Morales

Deborah Cullen-Morales, formerly known as Deborah Cullen, is an American art curator and museum director with a specialization in Latin American and Caribbean art.

== Career ==
Born Deborah Cullen, she belongs to a second generation of curators making sustained efforts to bring attention to Latin-American and Caribbean artists. In the 1980s, she began working with Jamaican-American printmaker Robert Blackburn at his New York-based Printmaking Workshop. She was curator of the Workshop’s collection from 1993 to 1996 and arranged for some 2500 of its holdings to be acquired by the Library of Congress, Washington, D.C. She earned her Ph.D. in 2002 from the Graduate Center of the City University of New York, with a dissertation on Blackburn, and in 2014, she curated a retrospective on Blackburn at the David C. Driskell Center for the Study of the Visual Arts and Culture of African-Americans and the African Diaspora, at the University of Maryland, College Park.

From 1997 to 2012, Cullen-Morales worked at El Museo del Barrio, New York, ending as their Director of Curatorial Programs, where she curated about a dozen shows (and authored the corresponding catalogs) on contemporary movements in Latin American and Caribbean art. Among the shows she curated there are Arte no es Vida: Actions by Artists of the Americas 1960-2000 (2008), Nexus New York: Latin/American Artists in the Modern Metropolis (2009), and Retro/Active: The Work of Rafael Ferrer (2010). Nexus was called an "absorbing chronological history of the Latino art presence in this city in the first half of the last century," while Arte no es Vida won an Emily Hall Tremaine Exhibition Award. She was part of a curatorial team that organized the multi-venue exhibition Caribbean: Crossroads of the World at El Museo, the Queens Museum of Art, and the Studio Museum in Harlem, and she also co-curated the first four editions of El Museo’s contemporary arts biennial, The S-Files/The Selected Files (1999, 2000, 2002, 2004).

In 2012, Cullen-Morales became the director and chief curator at the Miriam and Ira D. Wallach Art Gallery at Columbia University, New York. During her five years there, she curated Interruption: The 30th Biennial of Graphic Arts (Ljubljana, 2013); and The Hive: The Third Poligraphic Trienal of San Juan (Puerto Rico, 2012). In 2017, she founded Uptown, a triennial of contemporary art initiated by the Wallach Art Gallery in collaboration with 12 institutions in northern Manhattan that showcased more than 75 artists’ work. Cullen-Morales also oversaw the development of new gallery facilities at the Lenfest Center for the Arts, designed by Renzo Piano Building Workshop, on Columbia University’s Manhattanville campus.

In 2018, Cullen-Morales became Executive Director of the Bronx Museum of the Arts, a position she held for less than two years before moving to the Mellon Foundation as a Program Officer with the Arts and Cultural Heritage program.

Cullen-Morales is a longtime Associate of the Los-Angeles-based Institute of Cultural Inquiry, for which she edited the 1997 volume Bataille's Eye & ICI Field Notes 4.

== Awards and Fellowships ==
In 2002, Cullen-Morales received a curatorial award from Faith Ringgold’s “Anyone Can Fly” Foundation. Her 2010 book on Rafael Ferrer won the International Latino Book Awards first place prize for Best Arts Book. She has held curatorial fellowships at the J. Paul Getty Foundation (2001) and at the Center for Curatorial Leadership in New York (2010).

== Personal life ==
She changed her last name to Cullen-Morales after she married the Puerto Rican artist Arnaldo Morales.

== Curated exhibitions ==
- "Interruption: The 30th Biennial of Graphic Arts", Ljubljana, Slovenia, 2013.
- "El Pana/The Hive: The Third Poligraphic Trienal of San Juan", Puerto Rico, 2012.
- "Retro/Active: The Work of Rafael Ferrer", El Museo Del Barrio, New York, 2010.
- "Nexus New York: Latin/American Artists in the Modern Metropolis", El Museo Del Barrio, New York, 2009.
- "Arte no es Vida: Actions by Artists of the Americas 1960-2000", El Museo Del Barrio, New York, 2008.

== Books and Catalogs ==
- A Handbook of Latinx Art (Documents of Twentieth-Century Art). Edited by Rocío Aranda-Alvarado and Deborah Cullen-Morales. UC Press, 2025.
- Interruption: 30th Ljubljana Biennial of Graphic Arts. By Deborah Cullen. Exhibition catalog, Black Dog Publishing, 2014.
- Rafael Ferrer (A Ver). By Deborah Cullen. Volume 7 of the "A Ver: Revisioning Art History" series, University of Minnesota Press, 2012.
- Caribbean: Crossroads of the World. By Deborah Cullen et al. Exhibition catalog, El Museo del Barrio and Yale University Press, 2012.
- Retro/Active: The Work of Rafael Ferrer. Edited by Deborah Cullen. El Museo del Barrio, New York, 2010.
- Nexus New York: Latin/American Artists in the Modern Metropolis. By Deborah Cullen et al. Exhibition catalog, Yale University Press, 2009.
- Arte (no es) Vida: Actions by Artists of the Americas 1960-2000. Edited by Deborah Cullen. Exhibition catalog, El Museo del Barrio, 2008.

== Essays ==
- "Contact Zones." American Art 26:2 (2012), 14–20.
- "Felix Gonzalez-Torres: The Jigsaw Puzzles." In Searching for Sebald, L. Patt, ed. ICI Press, 2007.
