= Bronx Museum of the Arts =

Art museum in the Bronx, New York

The Bronx Museum of the Arts

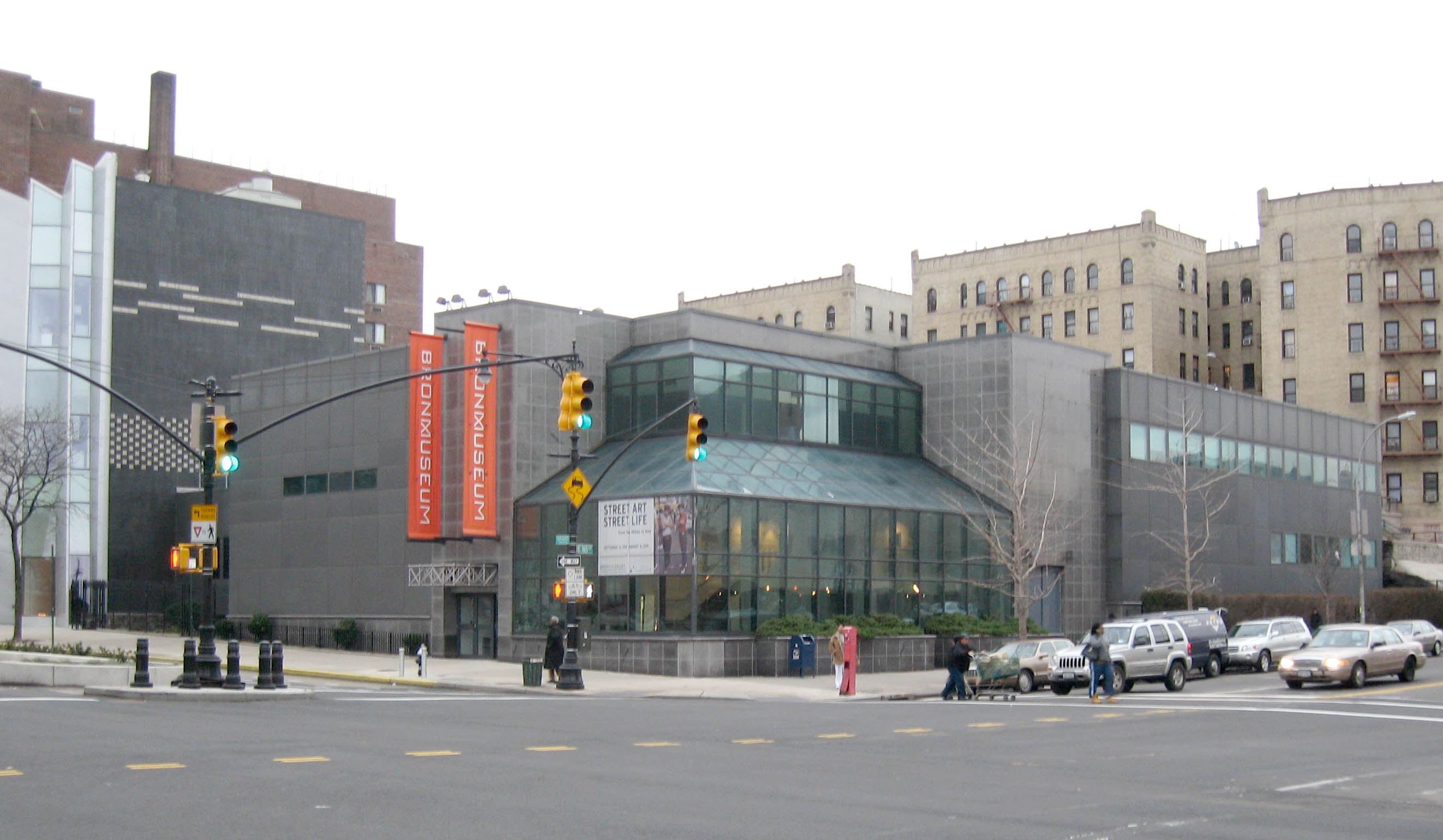
- Established: 1971 (55 years ago)
- Location: 1040 Grand Concourse; Bronx, New York 10456, United States
- Coordinates: 40°49′51.6″N 73°55′11.5″W
- Type: Art museum
- Founder: Irma Fleck
- Director: Shamim M. Momin
- Public transit access: Subway: to 167th Street; Bus: Bx1, Bx2, Bx33, Bx35
- Website: bronxmuseum.org

The Bronx Museum of the Arts (BxMA), also called the Bronx Museum of Art or simply the Bronx Museum, is an American cultural institution located in Concourse, Bronx, New York. The museum focuses on contemporary and 20th-century works created by American artists, but it has also hosted exhibitions of art and design from Latin America, Africa, and Asia. Its permanent collection consists of more than 800 paintings, sculptures, photographs, and works on paper. The museum is part of the Grand Concourse Historic District.

== History ==
The Bronx Museum of the Arts was originally opened to try to stir interest in the arts in the Bronx borough and to serve the diverse populations of the area. The museum opened on May 11, 1971, in a partnership between the Bronx Council on the Arts, which was founded in 1961, and the Metropolitan Museum of Art. The opening coincided with a borough-wide "Bronx Day" event. The first exhibit consisted of 28 paintings from the Met's collection. The museum was originally housed in the first floor rotunda (the Veteran's Memorial Hall) of the Bronx County Courthouse, converted using $77,000 in municipal funds. Additional galleries were located in the Bronx's Co-op City, Bedford Park, and Allerton neighborhoods, with the Allerton gallery was located in the Beth Abraham Hospital. In its first 12 years of operation, the museum held over 350 exhibitions.

In 1982, the city purchased a vacant synagogue at 165th Street and the Grand Concourse as a new location for the museum. The new location opened to the public in May 1983, in conjunction with "Bronx Week," which succeeded "Bronx Day." The new space was inaugurated with an exhibition of twentieth century artwork. It consisted of paintings, photographs, and prints borrowed from the Met. An expansion and renovation was completed in 1988 at the cost of $5.8 million.

In February 2004, construction began on a $19 million expansion project that doubled the museum's size to 33,000 square feet (3,100 m^{2}). The expansion opened in October 2006. In 2008, a 3,000-square-foot (280 m^{2}) arts center was added to accommodate educational programs for local schoolchildren and their families. Beginning on March 29, 2012, the museum ceased charging admission for all days, whereas previously, admission was free on Fridays only.

In 2016, the museum announced that it was starting a $25 million plan to renovate and expand and well as establish a $10 million endowment. The plan would be overseen by architect Monica Ponce de Leon, and it received $7 million from the mayor Bill de Blasio's office. The rest of the funds qere expected to be raised privately. The first part of the renovation was planned to be completed by 2020. The museum revealed a new plan for the renovation in 2022, designed by Marvel Architects. Work on the renovation did not start until July 2024, at which point it was slated to cost $33 million. The renovation was scheduled to cost $42.9 million by 2026. The project included energy-efficiency retrofits and accessibility upgrades.

== Building ==
The museum is located at the northeast corner of 165th Street and the Grand Concourse in the Concourse neighborhood of the South Bronx, slightly northeast of Yankee Stadium. The building was originally the Young Israel Synagogue, or Young Israel of the Concourse, constructed from 1959 to 1961 and designed by Ukrainian-born Simon B. Zelnick. The building was converted into a museum space in the early 1980s using concrete, steel and glass, at the cost of $2 million.

The 1988 expansion was designed by Castro-Blanco, Piscioneri & Feder, who renovated the building exterior with black granite and metal, added large continuous "ribbon windows" on the facade, and built a three-story glass atrium at one of the corners, which serves as the museum lobby. The 1988 design has been described as "awkward" and "darksome" with "cramped balconies" and a cornerside entrance that give it a "suburban mall" feel. It has also been criticized due to its lack of exhibition space.

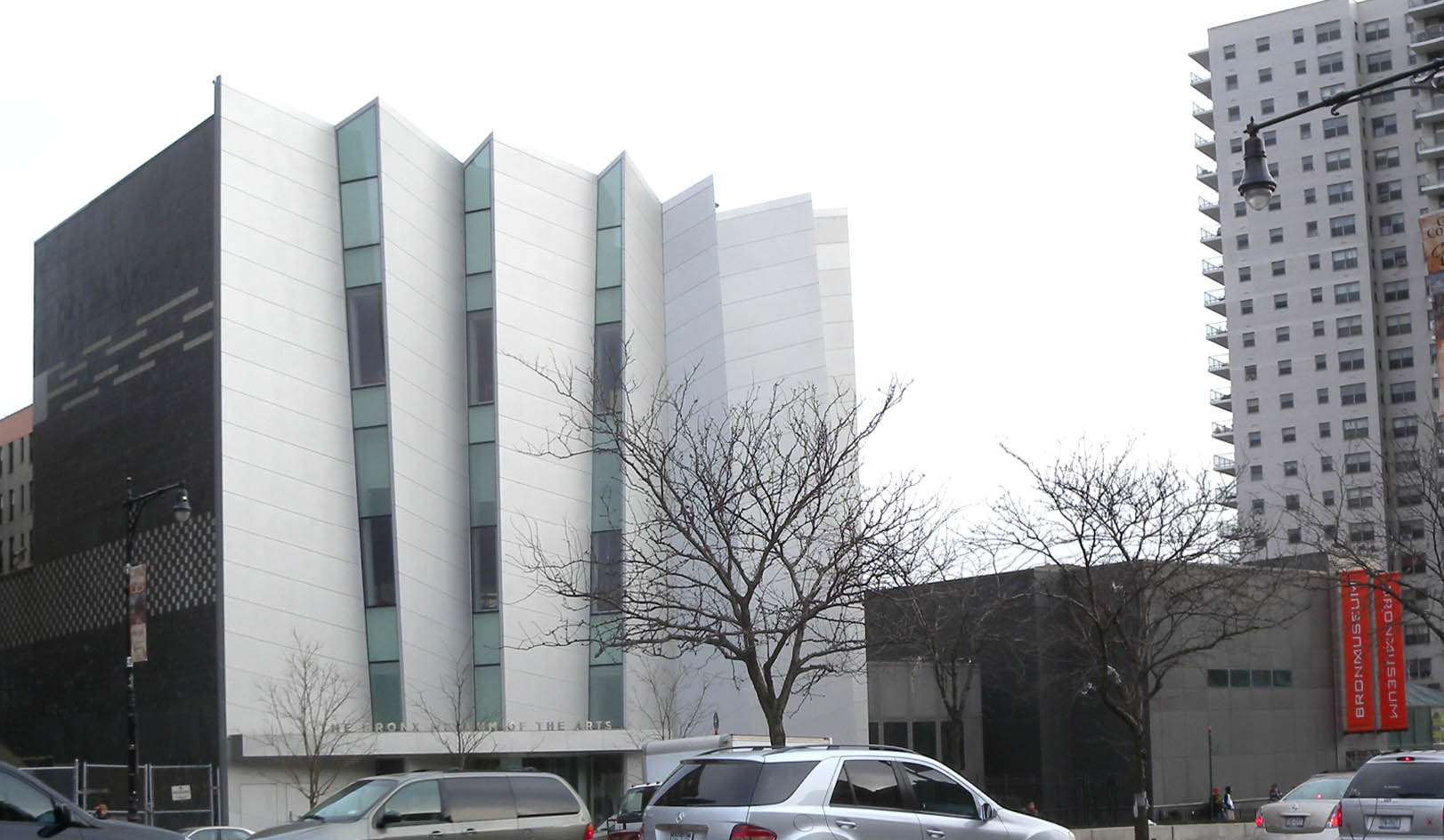
The "Accordion"-designed 2006 addition.

The 2006 expansion at 1046 Grand Concourse was designed by Miami-based architecture firm Arquitectonica, which added the three-story North Wing building adjacent to the original structure. It features a larger entrance with a two-story lobby, a new gallery and enhanced educational facilities. The outer design uses a "pleated aluminum facade" in contemporary Art Deco/Art Moderne style. It consists of seven irregularly-shaped vertical aluminum pieces connected by fritted glass, resembling an accordion or paper fan. The side of the structure features black and white concrete blocks organized in geometric patterns, similar to the brick facades of rowhouses and commercial buildings in the Bronx. These walls are temporary, designed to be removed in the event of future expansion, which would replace the original museum with a residential high-rise building. At the rear of the structure on the second floor is a sculpture garden. This new expansion has been described as "a white box with raw concrete floors" that, although "institutional," serves its purpose of being accessible to all visitors.

== Exhibitions ==
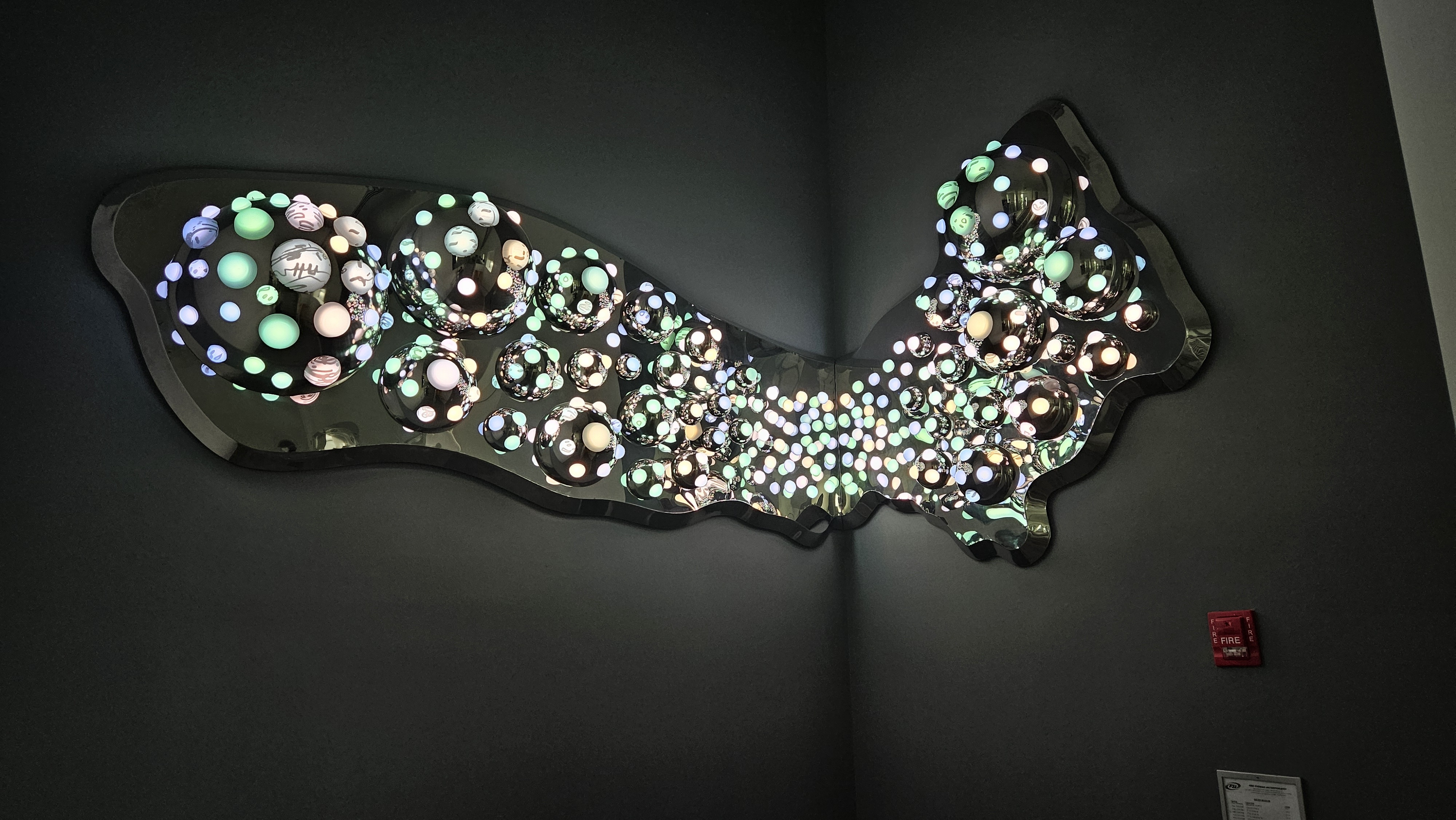
A light sculpture installation by Grimanesa Amorós, part of the museum's permanent collection.

In 1986, the museum began "A Decade of En Foco" with the exhibition, "En Foco Documentation Portfolio N1, The New York Puerto Rican Experience." In this series of exhibitions, the Bronx Museum of the Arts showcased works by artists in the En Foco organization, a group of photographers who work to promote the work of Hispanic artists. The series of exhibitions ended in 1986.

In 1987, the museum gained attention for two high-profile exhibitions: a career retrospective of African American artist Romare Bearden and a presentation of the then-evolving school of computer-generated art. More recent exhibitions have included the 2006 presentation "Tropicalia: A Revolution in Brazilian Culture" and the 2008 overview of street-level photography by Jamel Shabazz, a Harlem-based artist.

In 2013, the museum won a competition to represent the United States at the 2013 Venice Biennale; the museum commissioned “Triple Point”, an installation by artist Sarah Sze.

From 2015 to 2016, the museum held a retrospective of Martin Wong's career entitled Martin Wong: Human Instamatic.

In 2016, the museum featured the exhibition "Mask" by photographer Frank Gimpaya who collaborated with the En Foco organization for the exhibition. The exhibition was inspired by "The Veil" by Georges Seurat and was an attempt to celebrate the work of Gimpaya and a new-era for the En Foco group.

The museum annually hosts "The Artist in the Marketplace" (AIM) program where a panel of art professionals select artists to participate in the program. The aim of the program is to allow emerging artists a networking opportunity. The program ends with an exhibition in the Bronx Museum of the Arts.

== Management ==
The museum's founding is credited to Irma Fleck, who created the museum to try to reverse the decline of the South Bronx. She was a member of the Bronx Council of the Arts.

In 2006, Holly Block became the museum's director. She was previously the executive director of Art in General, a nonprofit organization in New York City, and replaced Olivia Georgia. One of Block's most known decisions as director was to make admission at the museum free in 2012, following which the museum has quadrupled attendance.

In 2011, museum officials also put together a council of residents to serve as "cultural ambassadors" to the community and to advise them on public engagement.

In July 2018, Deborah Cullen began as the director of the museum. Previously, the position had been vacant due to the death of former director Holly Block in 2017. Cullen previously worked as the director and chief curator at the Wallach Art Gallery at Columbia University. Deborah Cullen departed in 2019.

The board appointed former deputy director Klaudio Rodriguez as interim director in December 2019. Rodriguez came to the Bronx Museum in 2017 from the Frost Art Museum at Florida International University. In November 2020, he became executive director.

The museum has a $3.5 million operating budget. Once supported almost entirely by government funding, it is now funded mainly by corporations, foundations and private donors. The museum is typically able to spend $10,000 to $50,000 a year for acquisitions, and it receives donations and bequests of work. In 2013, it completed a campaign to raise $1 million for a new acquisitions fund that will focus on buying the works of contemporary artists with strong connections to the Bronx. The museum is a 501(c)(3) nonprofit organization.

== See also ==
- List of art museums
- List of museums and cultural institutions in New York City
