= Julie Moos =

Canadian photographer and art writer (born 1966)

Julie Moos (born 1966) is a Canadian photographer and art writer.

Moos' work was included in the 2002 Whitney Biennial at the Whitney Museum of American Art in New York and curated by Lawrence Rinder. Moos' work has been shown at the Birmingham (Alabama) Museum of Art, the Honolulu Museum of Art Spalding House (formerly known as The Contemporary Museum, Honolulu), the Mint Museum of Art, Norton Museum of Art, the Renaissance Society of Chicago and elsewhere.

Moos' approach to photography explores worlds of opposites. By pairing subjects side by side in various series including "Friends and Enemies" and "Domestics", she allows the viewer to compare individuals through an unrestrained formalism that asks us to see the equality of all people.

== Series ==
=== "Monsanto" ===
In a series titled "Monsanto", Moos photographs American farmers who cultivate their crops using Genetically Modified Organisms (GMO's) manufactured by the Monsanto Company. The series was created during her residence at the St. Louis Forum for Contemporary Art located near Monsanto's headquarters. Moos chose to represent her subjects in an objective manner despite the highly controversial topic of biogenetic engineering. Her portraits offered a straightforward, unbiased presentation of the farmer's work, the land, and the corporation supporting them. While the series included photos that followed her previous work's pattern by pairing two people in one photo, "Monsanto" veered slightly by adding heightened focus to the surrounding landscape and the presence of the unseen corporation. This series is based on James Agee's article "Let Us Now Praise Famous Men", published as a book with photographs by Walker Evans.

=== "Friends and Enemies" ===
The series features couples who fall into one of two categories: best friends or worst enemies. Moos places the two subjects against nondescript backgrounds, providing no extra evidence and allowing the viewer conclude the relationship between the couple.

== Personal life ==
Julie Moos is the wife of contemporary art curator David Moos.
