= Rolandseck station =

Train station in Germany

Rolandseck
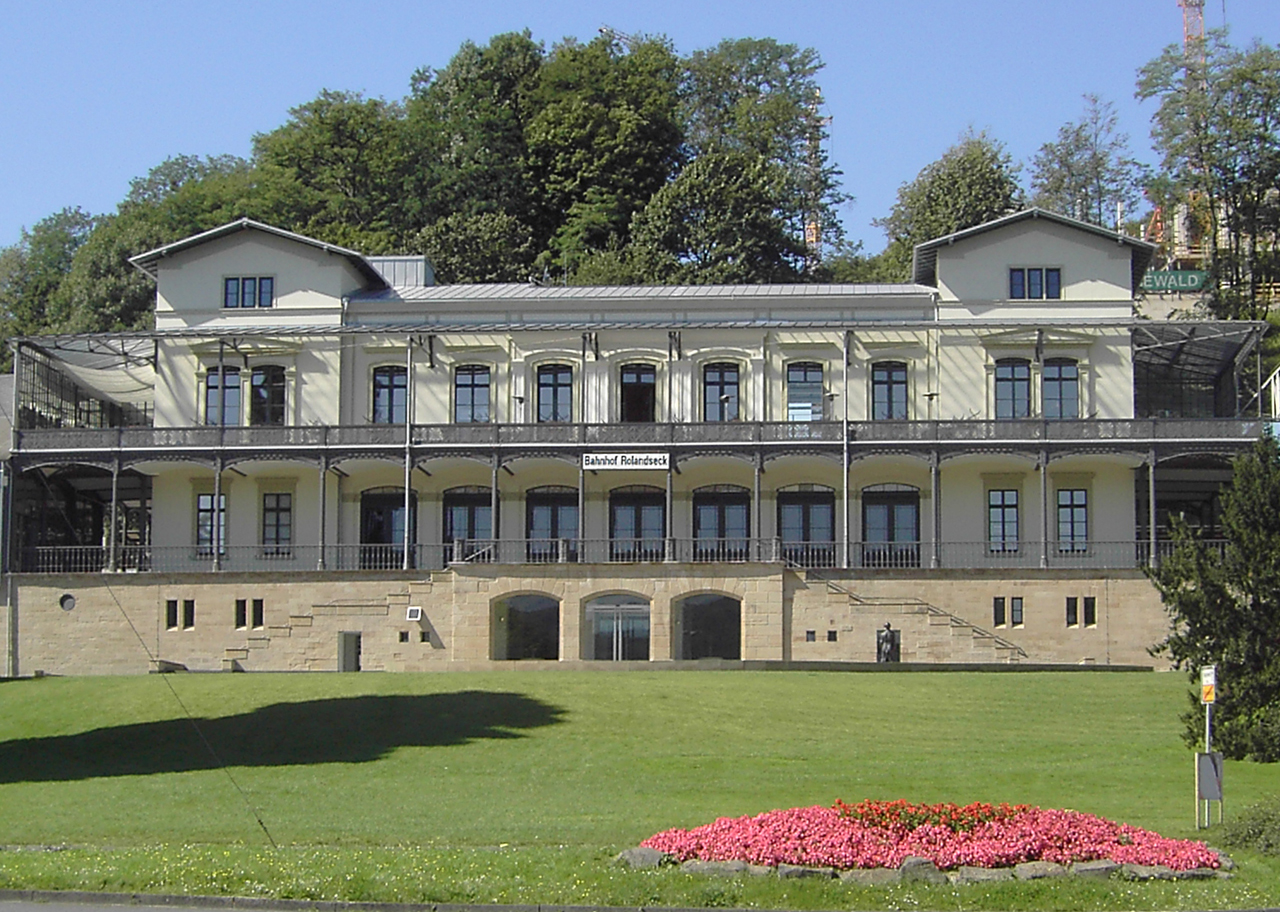
- Rolandseck station building

General information
- Location: Remagen, Rhineland-Palatinate; Germany
- Coordinates: 50°37′53″N 7°12′25″E
- Line: West Rhine Railway
- Platforms: 2

Construction
- Accessible: No

Other information
- Station code: 5328
- DS100 code: KROL
- IBNR: 8005153
- Category: 6
- Fare zone: VRM: 819; VRS: 2982 (VRM transitional tariff)
- Website: www.bahnhof.de

History
- Opened: 1858

Services
Preceding station	Trans Regio	Following station
Oberwinter towards Mainz Hbf	RB 26	Bonn-Mehlem towards Köln Messe/Deutz
Location

Rolandseck station in Rolandseck near Remagen, Germany, built from 1856 to 1858, is considered an important part of the cultural heritage of the Rhineland and a significant early Germany railway building. It is the northernmost railway station on the West Rhine Railway in Rhineland-Palatinate.

== History ==
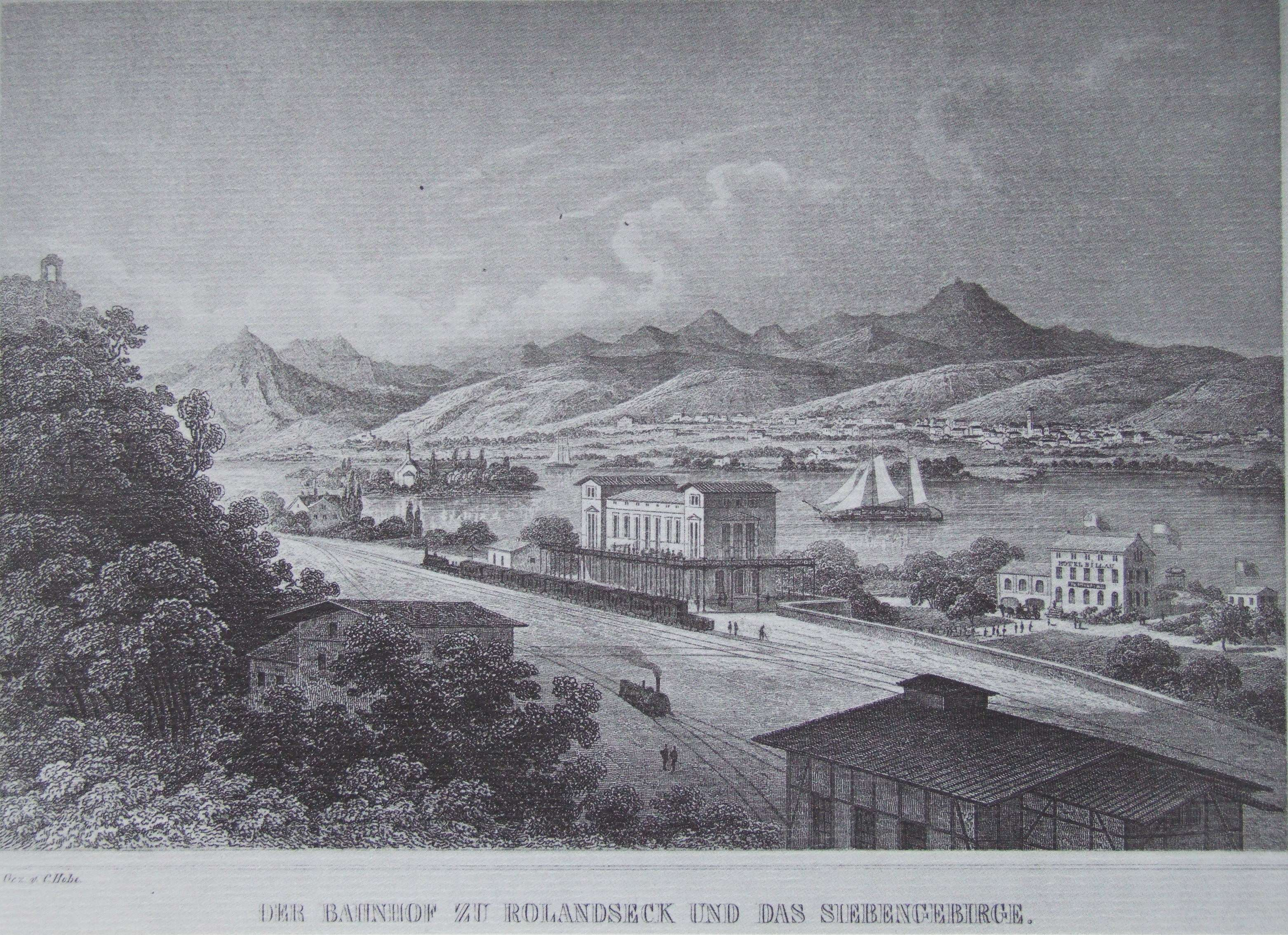
Rolandseck station, 1857

The Bonn–Cologne Railway Company (Cöln-Bonner Eisenbahn-Gesellschaft) extended its line (later the West Rhine railway) from Cologne to Bonn on 15 February 1844. In 1846, the company had requested permission from the Prussian government to extend the line to Rolandseck, but had been refused for military reasons. Finally in 1853, the Prussian Cabinet gave it provisional permission to extend the line as far as Rolandseck. The new terminus should have been as close as possible to the Rhine, in order to cater for comfortable transfers to steam ships. The supervising engineer for the building of the railway line also produced the sketches for the Rolandseck station, which was set out in such a way that the terminus of the line could hold company meetings, because at this time the Rolandseck area, together with Rolandswerther, was the epitome of Rhineland romanticism. Construction started in 1856 and was finished in 1858. It became the meeting place for society. Queen Victoria of the United Kingdom, Kaiser William, Otto von Bismarck, Heinrich Heine, Ludwig Uhland, Karl Simrock, the Brothers Grimm and Friedrich Nietzsche went there, as well as the musicians Johannes Brahms, Clara Schumann and Franz Liszt. Bernhard Shaw wrote about the station and Guillaume Apollinaire wrote some of his early poems here. There were many celebrations and concerts in the old station.

== Artist studios ==
After World War II, the station was no longer operated. In 1958 the president of the Deutsche Bundesbahn's Mainz region decided that "oversized" areas would be demolished and a small reception building would be established. Times changed, however, and in 1964 Johannes Wasmuth developed a plan for the station as an art gallery and studio. Within a short time the station became a center of cultural life. Hans Arp, Oskar Kokoschka, Bruno Goller, Günther Uecker, Gotthard Graubner, Stefan Askenase, Yehudi Menuhin, Martha Argerich, Martin Walser and Marcel Marceau represent some of the people who participated.

Only the death of Johannes Wasmuth ended the cultural life of the station.

== Arp Museum – Rolandseck railway station ==
After extensive reorganisation and rebuilding the station reopened on 22 October 2004, and as of September 2007 includes the entrance to the new Arp Museum, which is being built above the station in accordance with the plans of the architect Richard Meier. The station building could not be returned to its original condition due to structural changes made at the beginning of the 20th century. The renovation work aimed at restoring the structural condition of the station in 1906 with a veranda and a pale green painted facade. The whitewashed surfaces of the dining room were restored, so that stucco work can be seen once again. The entrance is now in the basement, which along with the ground floor, serve as the exhibition areas. Works by Hans Arp are displayed in the basement and temporary exhibitions are displayed on the ground floor. The dining room and bistro are on the second floor.

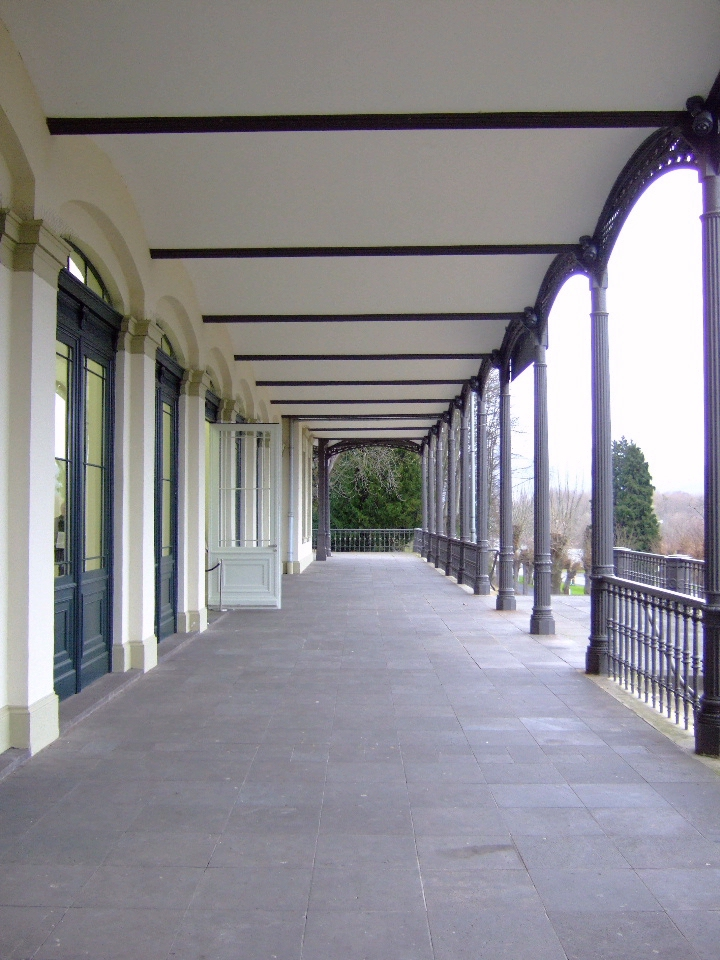
First floor veranda

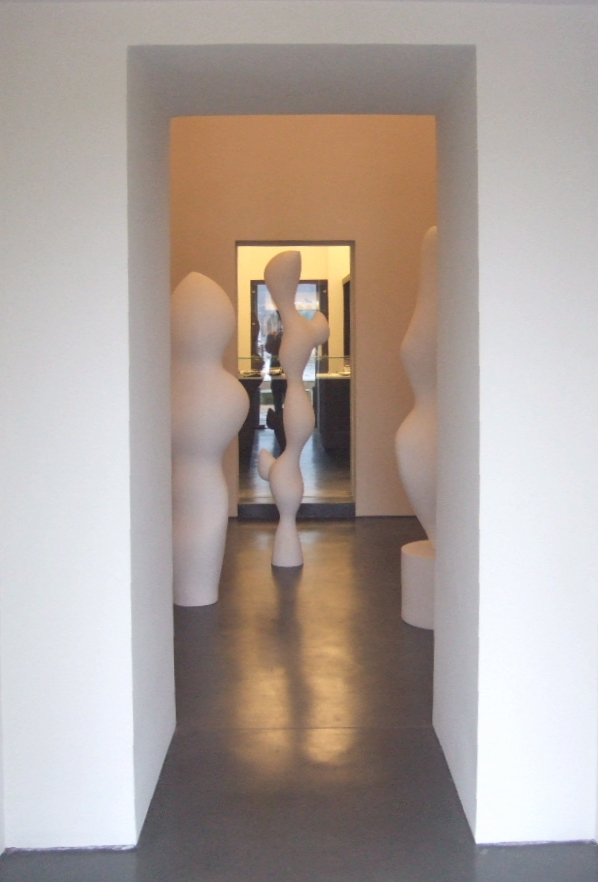
View from outside into the basement with works by Hans Arp

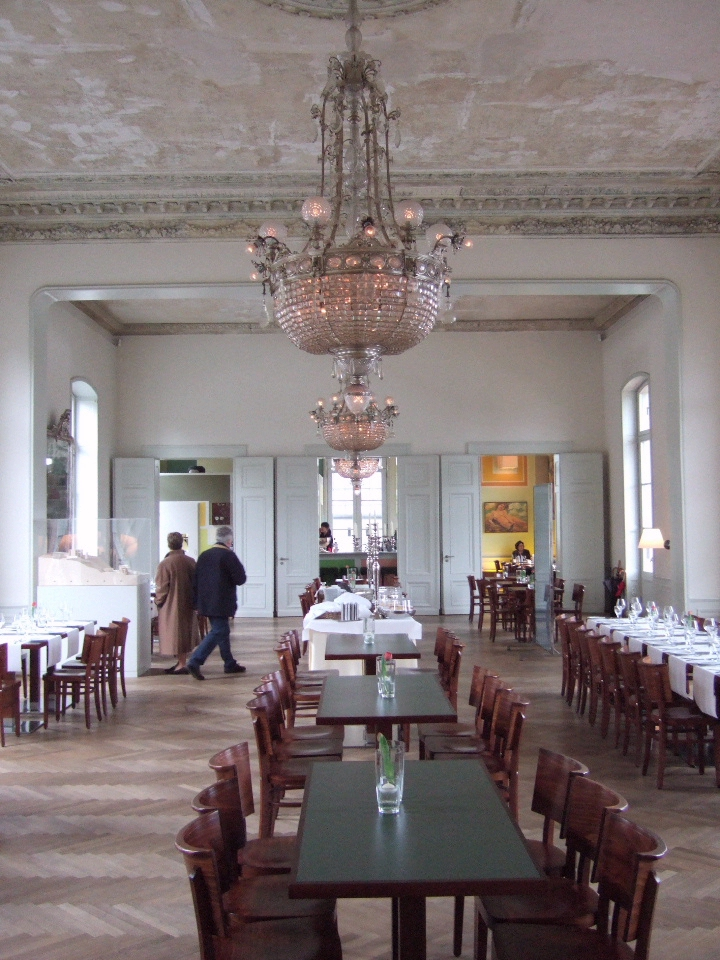
Dining room

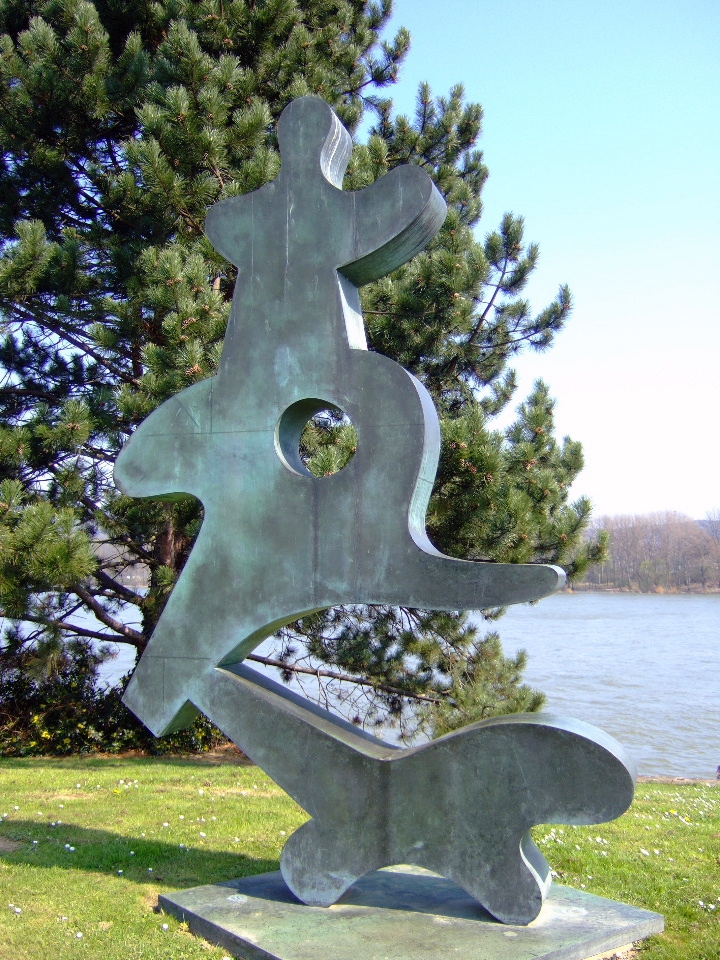
Arp: Tanzgeschmeide, museum sculpture

A characteristic of the Arp Museum is the exhibition of works by contemporary artists in its functional areas. In keeping with a tradition created by Johannes Wasmuth, works by the British painter Stephen McKenna that include colourful ironical quotations from the history of art were retained in the station's washrooms and bistro. In the course of the modifications further functional areas of the museum were equipped by various artists: the washroom by Maria Nordman, the bistro by Anton Henning, the library by the Swiss Thomas Huber, and the museum's helicopter landing pad was developed in the style of the Ingold airline project of Swiss artist Res Ingold (that is the logos, corporate identity, advertising and presentation material of a fictitious airline).

== Sculpture banks ==
The Arp Museum has developed since 2000, in co-operation with the city of Remagen, the Skulpturenufer Remagen sculpture garden along the Rhine bank between Rolandswerth and south of Remagen, on either side of the station.
