= Res Ingold =

Swiss artist

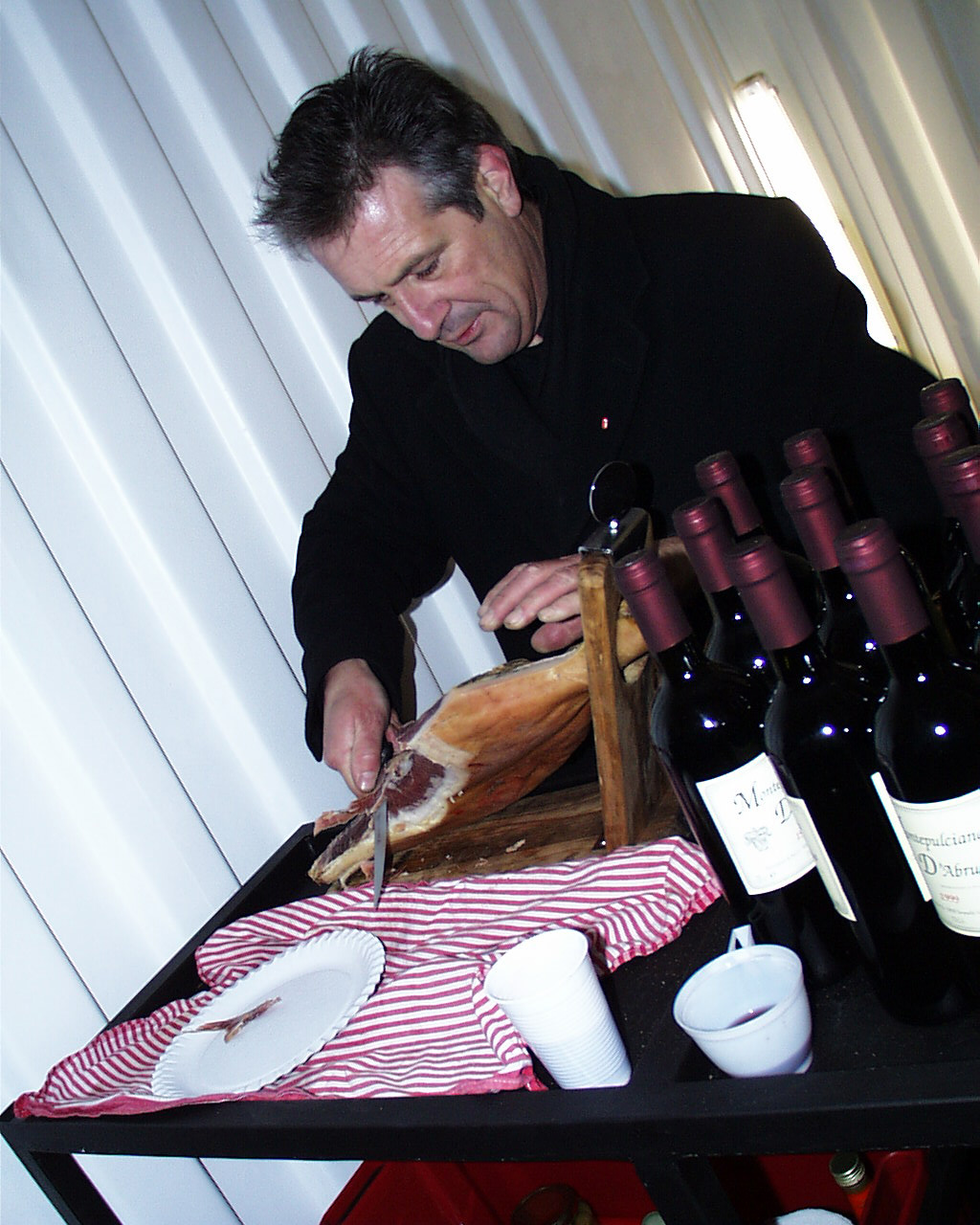
Res Ingold

Res Ingold (born 1954 in Burgdorf, Switzerland) is a Swiss contemporary artist. He is known for his superfiction airline company Ingold Airlines he started in 1982. Res Ingold is a professor at the Academy of Fine Arts Munich.

== Exhibitions and actions ==
- In 1993, he participated to the group show Business Art Business at the Groninger Museum, Groningen, Netherland, curated by Frans Has. Other artists invited included Banca di Oklahoma, Int Fish-Handel Servaas, Mark Kostabi, Name Diffusion (Marion Baruch), Philippe Cazal, Premiata Ditta, and Tecnotest.
- In 2000/2001 the exhibition ingold airlines - more than miles took place at Zeppelin Museum Friedrichshafen.
- On February 16, 2008, the gala 'Von Nagel zu Nagel' took place at the Kunst- und Ausstellungshalle der Bundesrepublik Deutschland
- In 2012 the International Ornithoport (airport for birds) by Res Ingold opened on top of the Kunst- und Ausstellungshalle der Bundesrepublik Deutschland

== Works in public collections ==
=== Germany ===
- Situatives Brachland Museum, Bochum
- Zeppelin Museum, Friedrichshafen
- Herbert Gerisch Stiftung, Neumünster
- Rolandseck station, Remagen
- Luftmuseum, Amberg

=== Italy ===
- La Serpara, Civitella d´Agliano

== Publications ==
- 2000: Wolfgang Meighörner, ingold airlines - more than miles. Quantum Books and Zeppelin Museum Friedrichshafen. ISBN 978-3935293020
- 2008: Walter Grosskamp and Stefan Römer, ingold - universal enterprises. Labonte Köhler Osnowski, Cologne ISBN 978-3933357403
