= Fictive art =

Works supporting invented narratives

Fictive art is a practice that involves the production of objects, events, and entities designed to support the plausibility of a central narrative. Fictive art projects disguise their fictional essence by incorporating materials that stand as evidence for narrative factuality and thus are designed to deceive the viewer as to their ontological status. Very often, these materials take a form that carries presumptive cultural authority, such as 'historical' photographs or 'scientific' data. The key tension in fictive art projects stems from the impossibility of 'making real' a fiction, no matter how many or what kinds of objects are produced as evidence. Since fictive art projects are designed to pass at least temporarily as 'real', fictive artists may draw opprobrium as hoaxers, pranksters, forgers, or con artists when their projects are revealed as fictional.

== History and usage ==
The term fictive art was originated by the artists Antoinette LaFarge and Lise Patt, in the title of a panel at the College Art Association Conference of 2004. It is allied to the terms superfiction and parafiction but, unlike both, does not construct the central activity as a departure from (super, para) fiction. Instead, it argues for the primacy of the visual art components, emphasizing the role they play in establishing, extending, and enabling the central narrative. A number of exhibitions in recent years have included examples of fictive art as part of broad explorations of the relationship between media, illusion, and deception; examples include "More Real? Art in the Age of Truthiness" at SITE Santa Fe (2012) and "Faking It" at the Museum of Modern Art, New York (2012). Antoninette LaFarge's Sting in the Tale: Art, Hoax and Provocation (2021) published an exhaustive review of many practitioners of fictive art.

== Examples of fictive art ==
Fictive art has antecedents going back several centuries; for example, the 'Rowley' creations of Thomas Chatterton, the 'Formosan' inventions of George Psalmanazar, or the Cottingley fairy photographs. With the rise of mass media in the second half of the 20th century, the practice of fictive art has expanded; it now includes such familiar forms as exhibitions and mockumentaries. Notable practitioners and projects include Norman Daly (The Civilization of Llhuros) 1972, David Wilson (The Museum of Jurassic Technology) 1988, Nicholas Kahn and Richard Selesnick (The Circular River) 1989-99, Beauvais Lyons (The Hokes Archives) 1990, Joan Fontcuberta (Sputnik) 1997, Eve Andree Laramee (Yves Fissiault) 1997, and Jim Shaw (O-ism) 1970s.
