= Christel Dillbohner =

German artist

Christel Dillbohner (born 1956) is a German artist whose installations, paintings, and assemblages are deeply involved with the relationship between personal and cultural memory and the human struggle to live in threatened environments.

== Biography ==
Christel Dillbohner was born in Cologne, Germany, where she studied art at the Cologne Art School (Kölner Werkschulen), receiving her degree in 1984. Since the mid-1980s, she has lived principally in the United States, first in Los Angeles, California (1986 to 1996), and subsequently in the San Francisco Bay Area.

Dillbohner's principal media are painting, installation, and assemblage. Field research is a central part of her artistic process and has taken her to Japan, Indonesia, Sri Lanka, Great Britain, New Zealand, and Australia. Her emphasis on art as a transformational undertaking, as well as her use of highly tactile materials such as wax, tar, silk cocoons, and old wood, show the influence on her work of Joseph Beuys. Other influences include the German artists Gerhard Richter, Rebecca Horn and Wolfgang Laib.

Dillbohner's thematic, site-specific installations generally meld painting, various forms of assemblage, and works on and made of paper to create what one curator has termed "landscapes of the psyche". An installation inspired by Nepalese honey hunters, The Honey Gatherers (1993), featured large suspended conical forms, sheets of beeswax-impregnated rice paper covering the windows, and assemblages of burlap, felt, coal, rusted metal, and other materials. A series of installations entitled Sippwells in the early 2000s, inspired by Australian Aboriginal culture, featured encaustic paintings and large hanging sheets of perforated waxed paper, while the titular sip wells (depressions scraped in damp sand) were represented by shallow clay bowls set out in a row in a layer of crushed charcoal. A central element of her 2005 installation Histologies was 365 paper filter cones suspended just above the floor with monofilament, creating a sea of shapes that swayed in response to the gallery's slightest air movements.

In her assemblages, Dillbohner subjects discarded objects and natural material like seeds and bones to transformations that highlight their function as carriers of memory and sources of renewal. In her 2007 assemblage Timekeeper, for example, she offers a composition of used teabags and silkworm cocoons as a meditation on the passage of time.

Dillbohner's paintings adhere loosely to the genre of landscape but "oscillate between abstraction and representation." Often painted using encaustic techniques, they evoke flowing water, massed clouds, ice fields, sedimentary rock, and other natural forms. Recent series of paintings include Lost Coast (2014) and Glacial Sea (2011-12). Projecting a sense of being both depthless and expansive, they hearken back to the spirit of German Romanticism.

She has exhibited at numerous museums and galleries in the United States, Germany, and Japan, including the Monterey Museum of Art, San Jose Institute of Contemporary Art, Fresno Art Museum, and Berkeley Art Center (all in California), the Boise (Idaho) Art Museum, Galerie Zeitzone (Berlin), Hafenmuseum (Bremen), Gallery Hirawata (Tokyo), and many others. She is a longtime Associate of the Los Angeles–based Institute of Cultural Inquiry and co-author of the ICI Press's 2007 book Searching for Sebald: Photography after W.G. Sebald.

Her work is featured in several books on encaustic painting.

== See also ==
- List of German women artists
