= David Moos =

Canadian curator (born 1965)

David Moos (born 23 October 1965) is the president of David Moos Art Advisory and a co-founder of The Museum Exchange.

== Career ==
Moos was born in Toronto. He completed his bachelor's degree in art history at McGill University, Montreal and master's degree and doctorate in art history from Columbia University, New York.

From 1998 to 2004, Moos was Curator of Contemporary Art at the Birmingham Museum of Art, Alabama. In this position, he organized the traveling exhibitions Samuel Mockbee and the Rural Studio: Community Architecture, William Wegman: Fashion Photographs, Yayoi Kusama: Early Drawings from the Collection of Richard Castellane, Jonathan Lasker: Selective Identity, and Radcliffe Bailey: The Magic City. He has worked with many other artists including Michael Awad, Willie Cole, Jessica Diamond, Stephen Hendee, Lonnie Holley, Luis Jimenez, Alex Katz, Anselm Kiefer, Mark Lewis, Beatriz Milhazes, Orlan, Tony Scherman, Frank Thiel, and Lawrence Weiner.

From 2005 to 2011, Moos was the Curator of Modern and Contemporary Art at the Art Gallery of Ontario (AGO), Toronto. He organized the exhibitions Iain Baxter&: Works 1958-2011, Julian Schnabel: Art and Film, Wangechi Mutu: This You Call Civilization?, He Named Her Amber: Iris Häussler, Wallworks: Contemporary Artists and Place, The Shape of Colour: Excursions in Colour Field Art, 1950-2005, and co-ordinated the Toronto installation with David Cronenberg of Andy Warhol / Supernova: Stars, Deaths and Disasters, 1962-1964. He presided over the inaugural installation of the new Frank Gehry-designed Vivian and David Campbell Centre for Contemporary Art in 2008.

Moos is a former contributing editor of Art Papers and Art US.

David Moos is married to Julie Moos, a Canadian-born photographer.

== Publications ==
- David Moos, ed., Iain Baxter&: Works 1958-2011 (Toronto, Art Gallery of Ontario, 2011)
- David Moos, Julian Schnabel: Art and Film (Toronto: Art Gallery of Ontario, 2010)
- David Moos, ed., Wangechi Mutu: This You Call Civilization? (Toronto: Art Gallery of Ontario, 2010)
- David Moos, ed., Alex Katz: Seeing, Drawing, Making (Vero Beach: Windsor Press, 2008)
- David Moos, ed., Julian Schnabel: Summer, Paintings 1976-2007 (Milano: Skira, 2008)
- David Moos, ed., Julian Schnabel Navigation Drawings (New York: Sperone Westwater Gallery, 2008)
- David Moos, ed., Wallworks: Contemporary Artists and Place (Toronto: Art Gallery of Ontario, 2007)
- David Moos, "Things of Paint: The Work of Jonathan Lasker," in Jonathan Lasker (New York: Cheim & Read, 2007)
- David Moos and Robert Hobbs, Frank Thiel: A Berlin Decade, 1995-2005 (Stuttgart: Hatje Cantz, 2006)
- David Moos, ed., The Shape of Colour: Excursions in Colour Field Art, 1950-2005 (Toronto: Art Gallery of Ontario, 2005)
- David Moos and Michael Stanley, ed., Do We Think Too Much? I Don’t Think We Can Ever Stop: Lonnie Holley, A Twenty-Five Year Survey (Birmingham: Ikon Gallery, 2004)
- David Moos and Gail Trechsel, ed., Samuel Mockbee and the Rural Studio: Community Architecture (Birmingham: Birmingham Museum of Art, 2003)
- David Moos, ed., Jessica Diamond (Toronto: Art Gallery of York University, 2002)
- David Moos, "Painting and The Abstract Truth: The Art of Radcliffe Bailey," in Radcliffe Bailey: The Magic City (Birmingham: Birmingham Museum of Art, 2001)
- David Moos, Yayoi Kusama: Early Drawings from the Collection of Richard Castellane (Birmingham: Birmingham Museum of Art, 2000)
- David Moos, ed. Jonathan Lasker: Selective Identity, Paintings of the 1990s (Birmingham: Birmingham Museum of Art, 1999)
- David Moos, "Architecture of the Mind: Machine Intelligence and Abstract Painting," in Art & Design, Vol. 11, No. 5/6 (May/June, 1996)
- David Moos and Rainer Crone, Kazimir Malevich: The Climax of Disclosure (Chicago: University of Chicago Press, 1991)
- David Moos, Theories of the Decorative: Abstraction and Ornament in Contemporary Painting (Edinburgh: Inverleith House, Royal Botanic Garden, 1997)
- David Moos, "Details of the Self: A Context for Abstract Expressionism," in Forces of the Fifties: Abstract Expressionism from the Albright-Knox Art Gallery (Columbus: Wexner Center for the Arts, The Ohio State University, 1996)
- David Moos, "In a New Library: The Painting of Helmut Dorner" in Helmut Dorner: Durch (Hamburg: Vera Munro Galerie, 1996)
- David Moos, "Which World: The Sculpture of Harald Klingelhöller," in Harald Klingelhöller (Toronto: Art Gallery of York University / Brussels: Yves Gevaert, 1996)
- David Moos, "Annette Lemieux: The Evidentiary," in Annette Lemieux: Time to Go (Modena: Galleria d'Arte Contemporanea,1994)
