= Rollins Museum of Art =

Museum in Winter Park, Florida

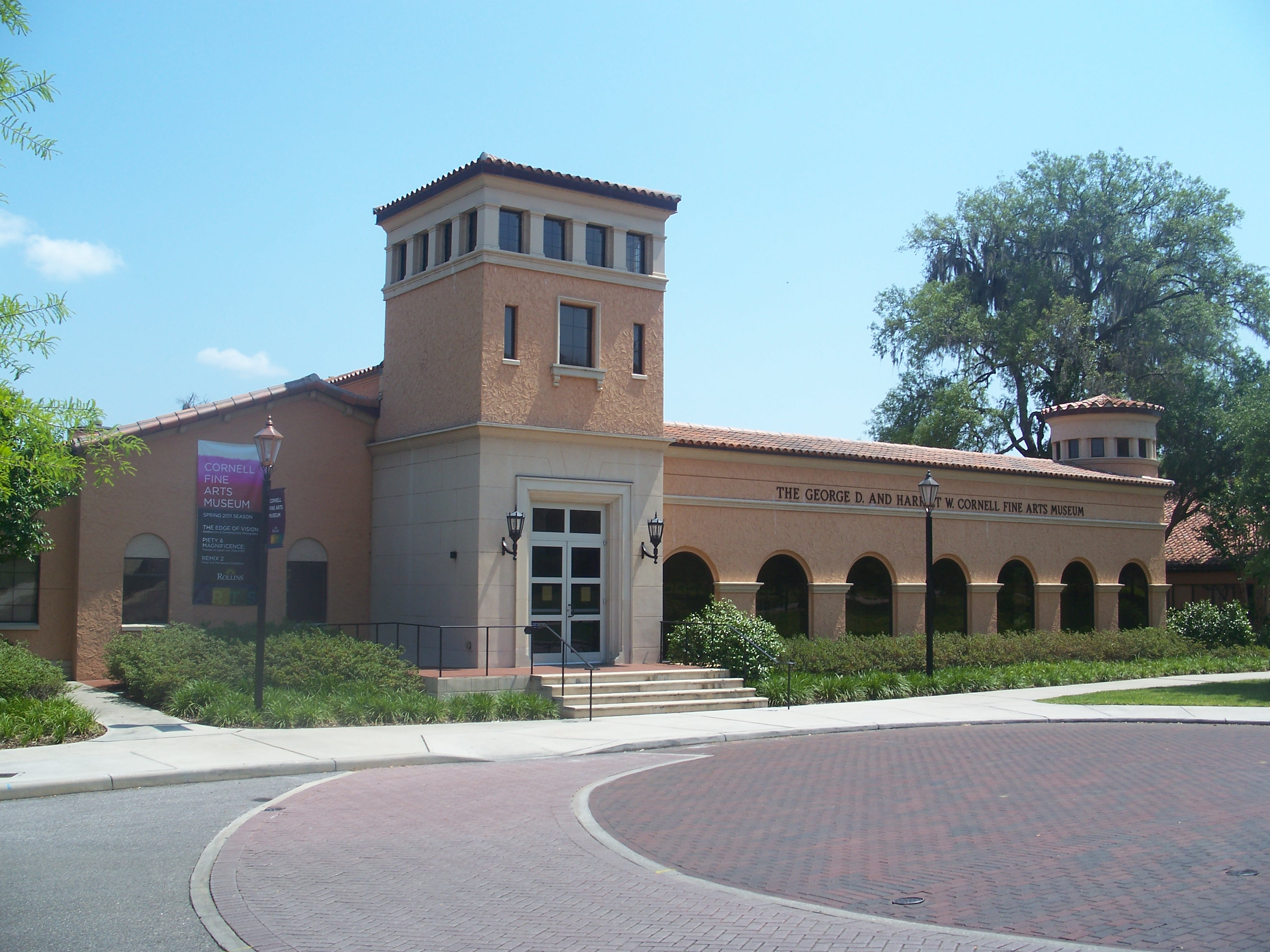

- Location within Florida
- Former name: Cornell Fine Arts Museum
- Established: 1978
- Location: 1000 Holt Avenue; Winter Park, Florida
- Coordinates: 28.59234°N 81.34862°W
- Type: Art
- Accreditation: American Alliance of Museums
- Collection size: 5,000
- Director: Leslie Anne Anderson
- Curators: Gisela Carbonell, Ph.D.
- Website: www.rollins.edu/rma

The Rollins Museum of Art (formerly the Cornell Fine Arts Museum) is located on the Winter Park campus of Rollins College and is the only teaching museum in the greater Orlando area. The museum houses more than 5,000 objects ranging from antiquity through contemporary eras, including rare old master paintings and a comprehensive collection of prints, drawings, and photographs. The museum displays temporary exhibitions on a rotating basis along with the permanent collection.

== History ==
A collection composed of portraits of college notables and natural history artifacts was put together at Rollins College around the turn of the 20th century. In the 1930s, fine arts were added to the collection prompted, in part, by the gifts of two Italian Renaissance paintings from the Samuel H. Kress Foundation. The first purpose-built museum on campus was the Morse Gallery of Art which opened in 1941. It was administered by Jeannette Morse Genius (who also provided the funds for the building) and her husband, Dr. Hugh McKean, who later became president of Rollins College (1951–69). In 1976, George and Harriet Cornell donated the funds to construct a fine arts complex that would include a new museum. The Cornell Fine Arts Museum opened its doors in 1978, and three years later became Florida's first college art museum to be accredited by the American Association of Museums (today the American Alliance of Museums). The building underwent a significant expansion in 2004–5, and now includes six galleries and a print study room. A satellite exhibition space for the museum's Alfond Collection of Contemporary Art was introduced in 2013 at The Alfond Inn—a philanthropic boutique hotel owned by Rollins College, whose proceeds help fund student scholarships.

== Collection ==
Collection totals more than 5,000 objects ranging from antiquity through contemporary:

- Over 500 paintings from the 14th–21st centuries.
- Over 1500 prints, drawings and photographs dating from the 15th–21st centuries.
- Over 1100 ethnographic objects and object fragments, many from the original natural history museum on campus; some of the items were donated by the Smithsonian after that museum burned in the 1920s.
- Over 1200 watch keys ranging from the 16th–late 19th centuries.

== Highlights ==
- 1936: General and Mrs. John Carty donate the first old master painting, The Dead Christ with Symbols of the Passion, by Lavinia Fontana. Donations by the Samuel H. Kress Foundation in 1937 and 1938 formally inaugurate fine art collecting.
- 1948: Grandma Moses gives to the college the oil painting, Out on the Lake.
- 1950s: George H. Sullivan, a Winter Park resident, made the first major donations to the museum, including works by William Louis Sonntag and Francesco de Mura.
- 1960s: Rollins alumni Jack and June Myers donate what would become the backbone of the Cornell's old master collection, including works by Gerolamo Bassano, Jacopo Tintoretto, Thomas Lawrence, Giovanni Domenico Tiepolo, William-Adolphe Bouguereau, Pieter Claesz.
- 2000: Kenneth Curry bequeathed more than 30 Bloomsbury Group paintings and drawings.
- 2008: The Andy Warhol Foundation for the Visual Arts donated 156 photographs and polaroids through the Andy Warhol Photographic Legacy Program.
- 2013: Barbara and Ted Alfond donated The Alfond Collection of Contemporary Art at Rollins College, which in 2015 included more than 230 paintings, photographs, sculptures and mixed media works by established and emerging contemporary artists from around the world.
- 2021: On July 28, Dr. Ena Heller, director of the museum announced that the Cornell Fine Arts Museum or what has been previously known as CFAM, will be known as the Rollins Museum of Art effective starting fall 2021. The name change is to signify the beginning of a new phase in the museum's 40-year history and a capital campaign for Rollins College as they prepare for a new state-of-the-art multi-million dollar facility in Winter Park across from the Rollins owned Alfond Inn. The capital campaign is known as the Innovation Triangle project which includes a new and larger museum facility with teaching capabilities, a new and permanent location for the Rollins College - Crummer Graduate School of Business, and an expansion of the Alfond Inn.

== Selected artists ==
- Lavinia Fontana
- Cosimo Roselli
- Pablo Picasso
- Robert Priseman
- Francisco Soliment
- Alfredo Jaar
- Jean-Michel Basquiat
- Andy Warhol
- Hermann Ottomar Herzog
- Jonas Lie
- Kara Walker
- William Sontag
- Childe Hassam
- Tracey Emin
- Vanessa Bell
- David Hockney
- Norman Daly
- Romare Bearden
- Robert Henri
- Francesco de Mura
- Elizabeth Catlett
- Sam Gilliam
- Francis Bacon
- Albert Bierstadt
- William-Adolphe Bouguereau
- Chuck Close
- Vik Muniz
- John Frederick Kensett
- Jacob Lawrence
- William Kentridge
- Jacques Lipchitz
- Maya Lin
- Thomas Gainsborough
- Henry Moore
- Robert Motherwell
- Claes Oldenburg
- Winslow Homer
- William Merritt Chase
