= Linda Weintraub =

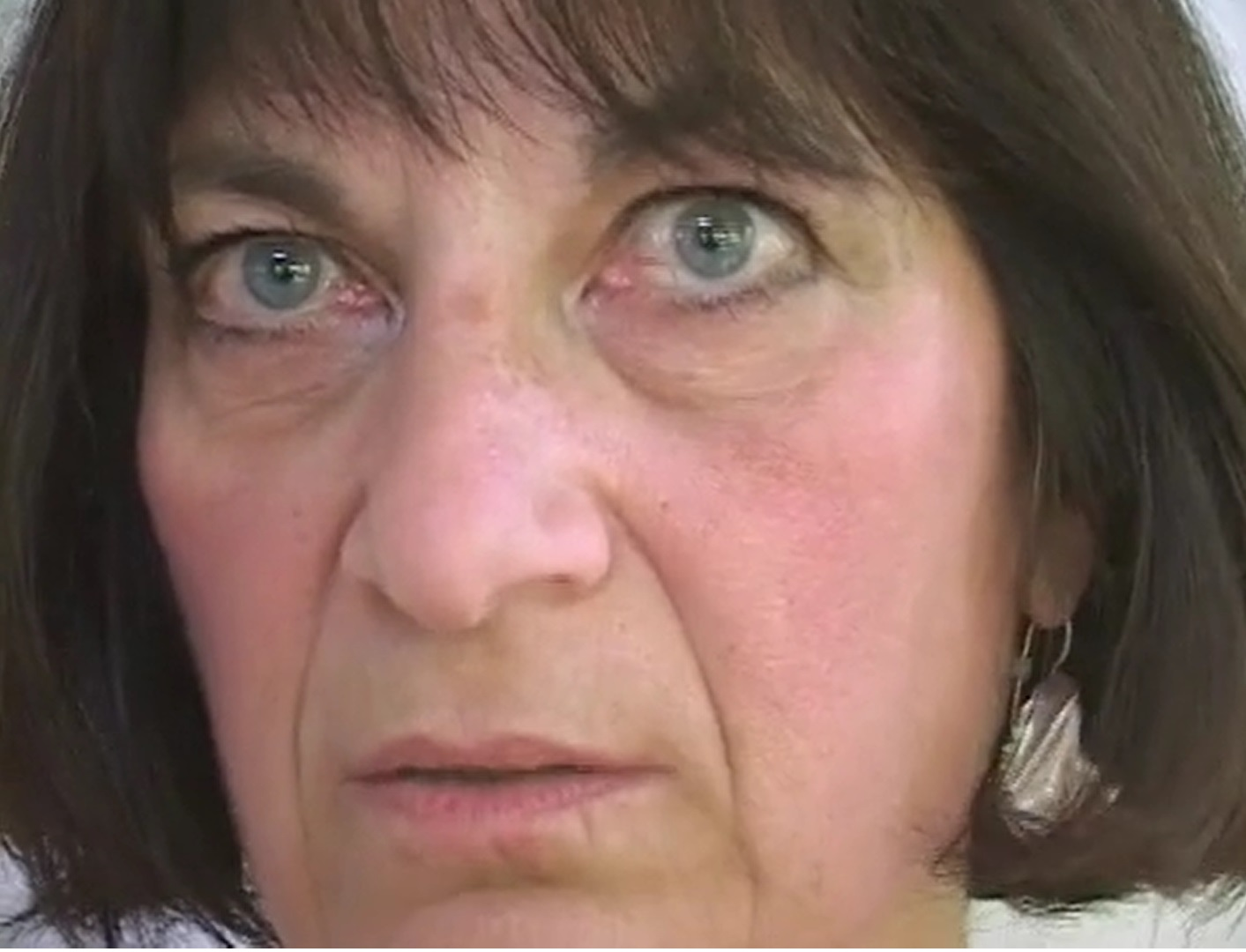
- Weintraub in Speaking Portraits
- Born: Linda Abraham; Elizabeth, NJ, USA
- Occupations: Art writer, educator, curator, artist

Linda Weintraub is an American art writer, educator and curator. She has written several books on contemporary art. Her most recent works address environmental consciousness that defines the ways cultures approach art, science, ethics, philosophy, politics, manufacturing, and architecture.

== Biography ==
Weintraub lives in Rhinebeck, New York. She received a Bachelor of Arts and a Masters of Fine Arts at Douglass College Rutgers University, New Brunswick, New Jersey. Weintraub is an educator having taught at The New School, Muhlenberg College, Cedar Crest College, Lafayette College, State University of New York at New Paltz, and the Hartford Art School Interdisciplinary Master of Fine Arts Program at Hartford University. During 1982–1992 she was the Director of the Edith C. Blum Art Institute at Bard College. At Oberlin College Weintraub held the position of the Henry R. Luce Professor in the Emerging Arts, where she founded an interdisciplinary arts program. She has lectured widely on the topic of contemporary art practice, environmental and ecological art. Weintraub is the Director of Artnow Publications, an enterprise devoted to applying ecological parameters for the material production of books produced using environmentally responsible processes. She designed and manages a sustainable permaculture homestead. Her hand-made home was built out of recycled cars, and is geothermally heated and cooled.

== Recent books ==
Weintraub's most recent book, To Life!: Eco Art in Pursuit of a Sustainable Planet chronicles the emerging EcoArt discipline, examining a range of artistic responses to environmental issues and concerns. This book is the first international survey of 20th and 21st century artists who tackle and transform complex global problems that effect humankind other species and ecological systems. This historical and pedagogical text fosters awareness in the next generation of interdisciplinary artists: students of art, design, environmental studies and environmental science to integrate responsible behaviors and activism into their personal and professional lives. Weintraub has also authored In the Making: Creative Options for Contemporary Artists in which she examines the conceptual and practical "ways of making" as deployed by forty contemporary artists. Her book, Art on the Edge and Over: Searching for Art's Meaning in Contemporary Society offers an introduction and overview of vanguard art practices.

== Curatorial work ==
Weintraub originated over fifty exhibitions while serving as the director of the Edith C. Blum Art Institute at Bard College and while serving as the Director of the Philip Johnson Center for the Arts, Muhlenberg College, Allentown, Pennsylvania. Recent exhibitions include: Dear Mother Nature at the Dorsky Museum, SUNY New Paltz she curated Dear Mother Nature. Smaller Footprints: Women Respond to Climate Change, for MOAH Ceder and WEAD (Women's Environmental Artists Directory); Rally Round the Flag of Justice, for Redline Contemporary Art Center in Denver, Colorado. Other exhibitions Weintraub has curated include Lo and Behold: Visionary Art in the Post-Modern Era, Process and Product: The Making of Eight Contemporary Masterworks, Landmarks: New Site Proposals by Twenty Pioneers of Environmental Art, Art What Thou Eat: Images of Food in American Art, and The Maximal Implications of the Minimal Line, "Is it Art?.

== Selected books authored, co-authored and edited ==
- To Life: Eco art in Pursuit of a Sustainable Planet 2012, University of California Press. Paperback ISBN 978-0-520-27362-7, Unjacketed Hardcover, ISBN 9780520273610, Adobe PDF E-Book ISBN 9780520954236
- Teaching Guides, To Life! Eco Art In Pursuit of a Sustainable Planet:
- "Eco Issues" http://www.lindaweintraub.com/teaching-guides/eco-issues
- "Eco Approaches" http://www.lindaweintraub.com/teaching-guides/eco-approaches
- "Art Genres" http://www.lindaweintraub.com/teaching-guides/eco-art-genres
- "Art Strategies" http://www.lindaweintraub.com/teaching-guides/ecoart-strategies
- "Water. Water." 2012. Artnow Publications and Centre of Contemporary Art, Torun, Poland. ISBN 978-83-62881-29-1
- Cycle-Logical Art: Recycling Matters for Eco-Art (co-author: Skip Schuckmann) 2007, Artnow Publications, Avant-Guardians: Textlets in Art and Ecology. ISBN 0-9777421-5-6
- EnvironMentalities: Twenty-Two Approaches to Eco-Art (co-author: Skip Schuckmann) 2007, Artnow Publications, Avant-Guardians: Textlets in Art and Ecology. ISBN 0-9777421-7-2
- Eco-Centric Topics: Pioneering Themes for Eco-Art (co-edited with Skip Schuckmann) 2006, Artnow Publications, Avant-Guardians: Textlets in Art and Ecology. ISBN 0-9777421-4-8
- Making Contemporary Art: how today's artists think and work London : Thames & Hudson, 2003. ISBN 9781891024597
- In the Making: Creative Options for Contemporary Art 2003, Co-published by D.A.P. New York and Thames & Hudson, UK. (also published as DVD; also published with user's manual) ISBN 9781938922718
- Art on the Edge and Over: Searching for Art's Meaning In Contemporary Society 1970s-1990s, (co-editors: Arthur Danto and Thomas McEvilley). Art Insights Publications, 1996. (Introduction by Arthur Danto. Conclusion by Thomas McEvilley.) Paperback ISBN 0-9651988-1-2
- Animal. Anima. Animus 1999, (co-author/editor: Marketa Sepala and Jari-Pekka Vanhala). Published by the Pori Museum of Art. ISBN 951-9355-61-8
- "Painted Bodies of the Americas", Harry N. Abrams Publisher, 1999. ISBN 0-7892-0268-9
- Art What Thou Eat: Images of Food in American Art 1990, Moyer Bell Publisher, distributed by Rizzoli Publishers. [Exhibition tour Edith C. Blum Art Institute] (contributors: Donna Gustafson, Gilbert T. Vincent, Kendall Taylor, Nan A. Rothschild). ISBN 1-55921-051-6
- "World War II Though the Eyes of Thomas Hart Benton", (co-authors with John Barnett). Marion Koogler McNay Art Museum, 1992 ISBN 0-916677-27-3
- The Transparent Thread: Asian Philosophy in Recent American Art. 1990 (co-authors Gail Gelburd and Geri De Paoli) Hofstra Museum, Hofstra University, Edith C. Blum Art Institute, Bard College, The Salina Art Center, Sarah Campbell Blaffer Gallery, University of Houston, Crocker Art Museum, Laguna Art Museum.University of Pennsylvania Press, ISBN cloth 0-812203094-9 ISBN paper 0-8122-1376-9
- Isabel Bishop. Essay, "Chasing the Shadows of the Times: The Drawings of Isabel Bishop and her Colleagues", 1989. (co-authors Helen Yglesias and John Russell). Published by Chameleon Books of Rizzoli International Publishers. Toured to Arkansas Arts Center. ISBN 0-8478-0976-5
- "My American Folk", 1989. (co-author: Howard Rose). Published by McPherson and Company. ISBN 9781878352019
- Process and Product: The Making of Eight Contemporary Masterworks 1988. (co-author Donald Kuspit). Edith C. Blum Art Institute, Bard College. Exhibition catalogue. ISBN 0941276147
- British Pop Prints 1987, Edith C. Blum Art Institute, Bard College. Exhibition catalogue.
- "Charmed Places: Hudson River Artists and Their Houses, Studios, and Vistas", 1988 (co-authors James Marston Fitch, Albert Fein, Donelson Hoopes, Sandra S. Phillips, William Rhoads). Harry N. Abrams Publisher, ISBN 0-8109-1041-1
- Pre-Modern Art of Vienna: 1848-1898 1987, (co-editor Leon Botstein. Contributors: Carl E. Schorske, John W. Boyer, Anton Pelinka, Wolfgang Greisenegger, Dietmar Goltschnigg, Jan E. Adlmann, Leon Botstein, Alessandra Comini, Erika Esau). Wayne State University Press. Paperback ISBN 9780941276115 Hardcover ISBN 0941276112
- The Maximal Implications of the Minimal Line 1985, (co-authors Donald Kuspit and Phyllis Tuchman). Exhibition catalogue. ISBN 9780941276061
- Thomas Hart Benton: Chronicler of America’s Folk Heritage 1984, (co-authors Matthew Baigell, Archie Green, Alan Buechner). Edith C. Blum Art Institute, Bard College. ISBN 0-941276-05-8
- "Archipenko: Drawings, Reliefs, and Constructions", 1985, (co-authors Joan Marter), Bard College, Bowdoin College Museum of Art ISBN 978-0-941276-08-5
- LandMarks: New Site Proposals by 22 Pioneers of Environmental Art 1984, (co-authors: Lawrence Alloway, Erik Kiveat, Daniel Simberloff, Shelley Rice). Edith C. Blum Art Institute, Bard College.

== Interviews ==
"An Interview with Linda Weintraub – Curator of "Dear Mother Nature: Hudson Valley Artists 2012" at The Dorsky by Claire Lambe"

Artist Linda Weintraub and Michael Asbill Discuss Weintraub's Participatory Art Show. WGXQ Radio feature story.

== Recent Exhibitions, Performances ==
Weintraub has had a solo exhibition, entitled "Grandmother Earth" at the CHRCH Project Space in Cottekill, New York. The participatory sculptural installation took the form of a large altar-like structure on the wall and floor of the gallery, made from organic matter from local woods—seeds, mushrooms, acorns, bark, twigs, bones, shells, moss, clay, and lichens. Throughout the course of the exhibition, viewers were invited to enlarge and expand upon the artwork by contributing their own one-foot square additions. She has exhibited in group exhibitions: "Water. Water." show at Emily Harvey Foundation, New York, NY; "Value of Food" at St. John the Divine Cathedral, New York, NY; "Food Shed" at Smack Melon Gallery in Brooklyn, NY, traveling to the CRC20 Gallery in Linlithgo, New York. Her work has also been featured at the Athens Cultural Center, Athens, New York, and the Times Center in New York City.
