= Institute of Cultural Inquiry =

Non-profit organization in Los Angeles, California, United States

Institute of Cultural Inquiry (ICI)
- Type: non-profit organization
- Industry: arts
- Founder: Lise Patt
- Headquarters: California, Los Angeles, United States
- Services: ICI sponsors art projects, performances, exhibitions and publications
- Website: Official website

The Institute of Cultural Inquiry (ICI) is a non-profit organization located in Los Angeles, California. Its mission is "to educate the public about the visual methods used in society to describe and discuss cultural phenomena." The ICI has sponsored art research, art creation in multiple media, projects, symposia, and publications related to its major areas of interest, which include the AIDS pandemic, obsolete technologies, and marginal cultural figures.

== Overview ==
The ICI was founded by Los Angeles-based artist and curator Lise Patt (1955–2019), together with a core group of ICI Associates who have assisted in the planning, implementation, and archiving of ICI projects. Since Patt's death in 2019, the ICI has been dormant, and as of late June 2021 it no longer occupies its long-time home at 1512 S. Robertson Blvd. in Los Angeles.

The Institute of Cultural Inquiry had two long-running projects that addressed the global AIDS/HIV pandemic. For the AIDS Bottle Project, which began in the 1980s and continued into the early 1990s, the ICI created unique glass bottles memorializing Americans in the arts and art-related fields who died from complications due to HIV/AIDS. Each bottle has an individual's name and year of death etched on the glass and a short biography printed under the lid; the bottles could be left empty or could serve as receptacles for personal memorabilia. The bottles have been publicly displayed at or outside such venues as the Los Angeles County Museum of Art, the New Museum (New York), and the New York Public Library. Afterwards, many of the bottles were given away free to members of the public.

The ICI's second long-running AIDS-related project was the AIDS Chronicles, which spanned the years 1993-2014. For this project, which celebrated its 25th anniversary in 2018, the front pages of the New York Times were collected. These pages were then painted over in dark red, leaving visible only information pertaining to the HIV/AIDS pandemic. Artists were commissioned to bind each year's set of 365 or 366 pages into a unique edition. On World AIDS Day, the ICI typically displayed the most recent year's loose pages as a wall installation, together with the bound edition of the prior year, creating a visual record of the ebb and flow of attention to the subject on the part of one of the most influential newspapers in the United States.

In addition to sponsoring such projects, the ICI housed some permanent exhibits as well as an archive and a library that were open to the public by appointment. Among the permanent exhibits were:

- the Earth Cabinet: a collection of earth from locations around the world
- the Ephemera Kabinett: a collection of ephemeral printed matter from around the world
- bound volumes of the AIDS Chronicles, with bindings commissioned from visual and book artists.

In 2011, the LA Weekly, in its annual "best of Los Angeles" issue, listed the Institute of Cultural Inquiry as the "best place to figure some shit out".

== Publications ==
Through its publishing arm, ICI Press, the institute has published half a dozen books ranging from anthologies to limited-edition artist books. These usually included a trade edition and at least one special edition, elements of which were likely to be handmade or otherwise unique. The ICI Press has also published catalogs, postcards, and ephemera. Additionally, items such as the Earth Kit and small objects made by ICI Associates have been available through the ICI gift shop.

In 1995, ICI Press published Bataille's Eye & ICI Field Notes 4, an examination of philosopher Georges Bataille's pornographic novel Story of the Eye, focusing on the publication and translation history of Bataille's text. Edited by Deborah Cullen, it presented essays, artworks and research related to Story of the Eye and was the first book to reproduce the original illustrations created by André Masson and Hans Bellmer for the first two editions of the novella. Bataille’s Eye also included a detailed publishing history that outlined the various appearances of the tale since 1928 along with a lengthy "excavation" project comparing key passages from four known versions of Bataille's tale, including a now-rare 1953 translation. A unique set of prints commissioned from 13 international artists and printed at Robert Blackburn's Printmaking Workshop in New York was reproduced in the book under the title Oeillet. The book also includes a round-up of projects by a selection of ICI Associates. It was produced in a trade edition and two limited editions that included complete sets of the Oeillet prints.

In 2001 came Benjamin's Blind Spot: Walter Benjamin and the Premature Death of Aura & ICI Field Notes 5: The Manual of Lost Ideas, an application of cultural critic Walter Benjamin's ideas to contemporary life, edited by Lise Patt. In the margins of the book was printed material from a found manuscript known as The Manual of Lost Ideas. Angela Glass, writing in Afterimage, called it "[a] concise and rewarding collection of essays.... [that] cleverly provokes far-reaching reconsideration of the lingering presence of blind spots and aura in today's art and culture." It was produced in a traded edition and two limited editions featuring a full-color sheet of stamps drawn from the Manual of Lost Ideas.

In 2007, the press published Searching for Sebald: Photography After W.G. Sebald, a 630-page survey of German novelist W.G. Sebald's use of images, together with artist's projects that were inspired by Sebald. Edited by Lise Patt with Christel Dillbohner, it was the first work to closely examine the role of photography in Sebald's novels, with essayists approaching Sebald through the filters of art history, film and photographic studies, cultural theory, and psychoanalysis. It included an English translation of an interview Sebald gave in 1997 in which he talks exclusively about his use of photographs. The book featured artworks by Shimon Attie, Joseph Beuys, Christian Boltanski, Andre Breton, Tacita Dean, Marcel Duchamp, Felix Gonzalez-Torres, Rodney Graham, Vic Muniz, and Gerhard Richter and artist's projects by Dorothy Cross, Pablo Helguera, Jeremy Millar, and Helen Mirra, among others. Richard Sheppard wrote that "the editors and publishers have done their work magnificently: the layout is generous and clear, the paper and illustrations are excellent, the structure is disciplined and subtle, the documentation, especially the bibliography...is impeccable." Jonathan Long called it "beautifully designed, printed, and bound to the highest standards, and [it] reproduces visual material with exemplary clarity."

Other ICI publications include 100/10 (2011, the catalog of a series of 10 ICI-sponsored curatorial projects), Speculative Pentimenti (2013, the catalog of an exhibition of paintings by Sande Sisneros), geZeiten (2009, featuring the work of Christel Dillbohner), Monkey Encyclopedia W (2019, by Antoinette LaFarge), and two books by Martin Gantman, Odalisque Suite and See You When We Get Home.

== Personnel ==
ICI Associates have included Robert Allen, Melinda Smith Altshuler, Anna Ayeroff, Greg D. Cohen, Deborah Cullen, Christel Dillbohner, Axel Forrester, Martin Gantman, Antoinette LaFarge, Gero Leson, Yolande Macias McKay, Arnaldo Morales, Deborah Paulsen, Pam Posey, Danny Redfern, Lothar Schmitz, Sande Sisneros, Terri Valli Trotter, and Daniel T. Walkup.

The ICI's Visualist-in-Residence program included some ICI Associates as well as Julene Paul, Maya Gurantz, Jaime Knight, Chris Handran, Amy Kaczur, and Jared Nielsen.

The Institute's Monkey Head Residence Program included Martin Gantman, Anna Ayeroff, Antoinette LaFarge, Greg Cohen, Pam Posey, Christel Dillbohner, Christian Smith, Amy Kaczur and the collective known as Thin End of the Wedge.

Other artists and writers who have been involved with ICI projects include Richard Smoley, Christine Nguyen, Norway Nori, and others.
