= Nan A. Rothschild =

American historical archaeologist

Nan A. Rothschild is an American historical archaeologist whose work has focused on urban archaeology, social stratification, and material culture in North America.

She is professor emerita of anthropology at Barnard College and an adjunct professor in the Department of Anthropology at Columbia University.

== Early life and education ==
Rothschild studied at New York University, where she was initially drawn to urban anthropology through a newly announced program. While there, she took a course with archaeologist Howard Winters, whose teaching sparked her interest in archaeology. Winters emphasized the use of archaeological materials as puzzles to be solved, an approach Rothschild later credited with inspiring her to shift from anthropology to archaeology.

She had originally proposed to conduct ethnographic fieldwork in New York City with a group called University of the Streets, but when the organization dissolved, she turned toward archaeology. Under Winters' supervision, she pursued a dissertation on sex and age roles in mortuary collections east of the Mississippi River, from the Archaic to the Mississippian periods. The project relied heavily on museum collections, reflecting Winters' belief in the research potential of curated archaeological materials. Rothschild's dissertation Age and Sex, Status and Role, in Prehistorical Societies of Eastern North America was quantitative in approach, consistent with the processual archaeology dominant in the late 1960s and early 1970s.

== Career and research ==
In the early 1970s, Rothschild became involved in the emerging field of cultural resource management (CRM), influenced by her mentor Bert Salwen at NYU.

She was active in developing methodologies and best practices for CRM projects in New York, including questions of compliance with new preservation laws, public engagement, and coordination between archaeologists, historians, and architects.

Rothschild went on to become an active figure in historical and urban archaeology in the United States. Much of her research has focused on New York City, a metropolis she has described as "a city of immigrants" whose constant reshaping offers a unique archaeological and documentary record. She has also conducted fieldwork in the American Southwest, integrating archaeological excavation with rich archival sources.

Her work emphasizes how urban archaeological evidence can illuminate the lives of ordinary people and challenge written histories that often privilege elite perspectives. She has highlighted themes of immigration, neighborhood formation, race, gender, and class, arguing that the archaeological record can recover stories excluded from traditional narratives.

She has increasingly drawn on concepts such as habitus and microhistorical analysis to interpret neighborhoods, households, and social practices.

== Scholarly works ==
Rothschild has authored and coauthored a number of influential books and articles that have helped shape the fields of historical and urban archaeology.

Her scholarship is marked by a focus on the intersections of material culture, social stratification, and the lived experiences of communities often underrepresented in written history.

Her early book Colonial Encounters in a Native American Landscape: The Spanish and Dutch in North America (2003), examined the literary and cultural constructions of colonial encounters, reflecting her interest in the relationship between material and textual evidence.

She later turned to synthetic treatments of urban archaeology, most notably in The Archaeology of American Cities (2014, co-authored with Diana diZerega Wall), which offers a comparative framework for understanding urban development in cities such as New York City, Philadelphia, and Tucson. The volume situates archaeological findings within broader social histories and highlights the roles of race, class, and gender in shaping urban life.

Her most recent book, Buried Beneath the City: An Archaeological History of New York (2022), with Amanda Sutphin, Arthur Bankoff and Jessica Striebel MacLean), integrates archaeological data with archival sources to trace New York's development from a Dutch colonial outpost to a modern metropolis.

The book received the Society for American Archaeology's Popular Book Award, recognizing its accessibility and contribution to public understanding of archaeology.

Beyond her books, Rothschild has published numerous articles and essays on topics including the identification of neighborhoods and subunits within cities, and the role of race and ethnicity in shaping urban communities.

Her studies of sites such as Seneca Village and the Stadt Huys excavation have been particularly influential in advancing methodologies for integrating archaeological and documentary evidence.

== Personal life ==
Rothschild was married to the late Edmund Rothschild, and subsequently to Michael A. Cooper, a New York based lawyer. She has two children and is stepmother to Cooper’s three children. Together they shared homes in North Salem, New York, and Martha’s Vineyard.

== Selected publications ==
- Wall, Diana Dizerega; Rothschild, Nan A.; Linn, Meredith B. (February 26, 2019), "Constructing Identity in Seneca Village", Archaeology of Identity and Dissonance, University Press of Florida, pp. 157–180, doi:10.5744/florida/9780813056197.003.0008, ISBN 978-0-8130-5619-7
- Rothschild, Nan A.; Wall, Diana diZerega; Nassaney, Michael S. (2014). The archaeology of American cities. The American experience in archaeological perspective. Gainesville: University Press of Florida. ISBN 978-0-8130-4972-4.
- Rothschild, Nan A. (2013), "Maria and Alida: Two Dutch Women in the English Hudson Valley", in Janowitz, Meta F.; Dallal, Diane (eds.), Tales of Gotham, Historical Archaeology, Ethnohistory and Microhistory of New York City, New York, NY: Springer New York, pp. 89–104, doi:10.1007/978-1-4614-5272-0_6, ISBN 978-1-4614-5271-3
- Rothschild, Nan A. (January 31, 2014), "Colonised bodies, personal and social", Past Bodies, Oxbow Books, pp. 135–144, doi:10.2307/j.ctv13pk5rd.17
- Rothschild, Nan A. (1990). New York City neighborhoods: the 18th century. San Diego: Academic Press. ISBN 978-0-12-598725-7.
