= Rhonda Corvese =

Canadian independent curator

Rhonda Corvese is a Toronto-based international independent curator. She received the 2006 Untitled Art Award of the Centre for Contemporary Canadian Art as Emerging Curator. In 2007 she co-curated the citywide Nuit Blanche art-event in Toronto.

== Recent projects (selected) ==
- The Idea of North, a sound art project of visual and media artists with exhibitions in Canada, Iceland and Norway (2005/2006)
- The Legacy of Joseph Wagenbach (2006), curatorial/artistic collaboration with installation artist Iris Häussler.
- The Watch Man (2007) an installation at Toronto's Interaccess by Shona Illingworth
- 25sec.-Toronto, a videoproject by Angelika Middendorf and Andreas Schimanski at Prefix ICA
- Co-curator of Toronto's Nuit Blanche 2007.
