= Wallach Art Gallery =

Art gallery in Manhattan, New York

Miriam and Ira D. Wallach Art Gallery at Columbia University
- Established: 1986
- Location: New York, New York, United States
- Coordinates: 40°49′02″N 73°57′32″W
- Type: Art museum
- Director: Betti-Sue Hertz
- Architect: Renzo Piano
- Website: wallach.columbia.edu

The Miriam and Ira D. Wallach Art Gallery is the principal public visual arts space and art museum of the Columbia University in New York City, New York, United States.

== History ==
Established in 1986, it advances the university's "historical, critical, and creative engagement with the visual arts." The current director of the Wallach Art Gallery is Betti-Sue Hertz. Originally located in Schermerhorn Hall, since 2017, the gallery has been located at the Lenfest Center for the Arts in Manhattanville, a building designed by the Italian contemporary architect Renzo Piano. Wallach's curatorial focus on traditionally under-represented artists, including local Harlem artists, has been described as a "welcome decision" by The New York Times.

They also present projects that are "organized by graduate students and faculty in Art History & Archaeology or by other Columbia scholars;" "Focus on the contemporary artists of their campus and communities; Offer new scholarship on University special collections."

In 2018, Wallach Art Gallery hosted the critically acclaimed exhibition titled Posing Modernity: The Black Model From Manet and Matisse to Today and curated by the American scholar of African American art Denise Murrell, which examined the depictions of people of color in European modern art. The exhibition later traveled to the Musée d'Orsay in Paris, under the title Le Modèle noir, de Géricault à Matisse, where it was expanded with more works of canonical French 19th-century painters, including Édouard Manet's Olympia painted in 1863.
