= Superfiction =

Art blurring the boundaries between fiction and fact

A superfiction is a visual or conceptual artwork that uses fiction and appropriation to blur the lines between facts and reality about organizations, business structures, and/or the lives of invented individuals.

The term was coined by Glasgow-born artist Peter Hill in 1989. Hill said he drew inspiration from Karl Popper's concept of "falsificationism," Thomas Kuhn's book The Structure of Scientific Revolutions, and anarchist Paul Feyerabend's book Against Method. Hill's website also calls the fiction of Jorge Luis Borges as an example.

== The Museum of Contemporary Ideas ==
In 1989 Peter Hill created his fictive Museum of Contemporary Ideas. Supposedly located on New York's Park Avenue, the museum's purported billionaire benefactors, Alice and Abner "Bucky" Cameron, were said to have made their fortune from the Cameron Oil Fields in Alaska. Press releases were sent around the world to news agencies such as Reuters and Associated Press and a range of magazines, newspapers, museums, critics and specialist journals. The German Wolkenkratzer magazine believed the museum to be real and printed a story about it. As a result its editor, Dr Wolfgang Max Faust was asked to chair a meeting of German curators and industrialists to see if Frankfurt could build an even bigger multi-disciplinary museum than The Museum of Contemporary Ideas.

The characters within the Museum of Contemporary Ideas were later "turned" into another Superfiction called The Art Fair Murders and traces of both were exhibited in the 2002 Biennale of Sydney, (The World May Be) Fantastic, curated by Richard Grayson.

With its "Encyclopedia of Superfictions", Hill's Web site is something of an information hub on methodologically related artworks.

Probably the first curated exhibition of superfictions was "For Real Now" (De Achterstraat Fondation, Hoorn, Netherlands) in 1990 .

== Roots and precedents ==
The practice of intentionally blurring the boundaries between fiction and fact has many precedents. Perhaps the best known of these is Orson Welles' adaptation of H. G. Wells' The War Of The Worlds which was broadcast in the style of a breaking-news report in October 1938, and led many to believe in an ongoing Martian invasion despite a broadcast disclaimer.

Another example are the "snouters" Nasobēm (or Rhinogradentia), an order of animals invented by the German poet Christian Morgenstern in 1905 and then introduced into scholarly publication by the (fictitious) naturalist Prof. Harald Stümpke (1957).

== Practice ==
Artists employing superfictions as a focus or significant part of their practice include:

- AA Bronson – General Idea – (1969–1994)
- Lyndell Brown and Charles Green – paintings of fictional worlds (since 1993)
- Kay Burns – performative lectures as the fictitious researcher/ethnographer Iris Taylor; and founder/curator of the Museum of the Flat Earth
- Janet Cardiff – many audio-walks that superimpose fiction and experience since the mid-1990s, Paradise Institute (2001)
- "et al." – e.g. The Fundamental Practice (2005)
- Joan Fontcuberta – e.g. Secret Fauna (since 1987)
- Rodney Glick – e.g. The Glick International Collection (since 1989)
- Iris Häussler – many "fictitious memories", constructed living spaces of fictional personae (since 1989)
- Oren Herschander – The Mountweazel Research Collection, an archive featuring a variety of material related to the life and work of American photographer and fictitious entry, Lillian Virginia Mountweazel.
- Peter Hill – Museum of Contemporary Ideas (since 1989)
- Damien Hirst – Treasures from the Wreck of the Unbelievable (2017)
- Res Ingold – e.g. Ingold Airlines (1982)
- Shelly Innocence – Shelly Innocence is a former supermodel, international athlete and in-store demonstrator marketing Happiness™, Integrity™ and other intangible products. 2005
- IRFAK Fat to Food Recycling, Glocal Affairs 2008, Mieke Smits
- Martin Kippenberger – inventions of fictional artists in the 1980s, within a much broader oeuvre of painting
- Eve Andree Laramee has exhibited works credited to Yves Fissialt, a fictional scientist with some elements based on the artist's father. Eve Andrée Laramée
- Dr James Lattin – founder and curator of the Museum of Imaginative Knowledge
- Leeds 13 – a year group of University of Leeds fine art students whose project Going Places (1998) simulated a Spanish holiday apparently paid for with financial donations
- Seymour Likely – a fictitious artist invented by Aldert Mantje, Ronald Hooft and Ido Vunderink
- Beauvais Lyons – Professor of Art at University of Tennessee and curator of the Hokes Archives which includes the Association for Creative Zoology, Hokes Medical Arts and the Spelvin Collection among others.
- Hugo Markl — Contemporary artist Hugo Markl performs a concentrated reflection on receptive processes per se – deliberate intellectual error – in relation to the processing of text, film, and art: tradition, culture change, and art movement understood as intellectual auto-digestion. Within every tradition, overcoming artistic and intellectual key works has been characterized by mixing facts with fiction.
- Mish Meijers and Tricky Walsh present The Collector Henri Papin
- Rebekah Modrak{ReMade Co, a fictional artisanal plunger company masquerading as a real company.
- Patrick Nagatani – Excavations, A series of photographs documenting proof of a worldwide ancient automobile culture.
- Philip R. Obermarck – The Gammon Collection (2012), a collection of artifacts and items recovered from the Great Plains Society for the Dissemingation of Information and Education.
- Eve-Anne O'Regan – BabyFace
- Eugene Parnell – e.g. Lost Naturalists of the Pacific (2005)
- Patrick Pound – e.g. The memory Room (2002)
- Walid Raad's – Atlas Group Archives
- Robert Smithson, The Monuments of Passaic (1967)
- Servaas – a fictional world of fish
- Michael Vale – Le Chien Qui Fume (2002 onwards). An historical satire that positions an icon of early 20th. century kitsch, the smoking dog, as an integral, but forgotten player in the history of Surrealism.
- Jeff Wassmann – an American artist working under the nom de plume of the pioneering German modernist Johann Dieter Wassmann (1841-1898)
- David Wilson – The Museum of Jurassic Technology founded in 1989, Los Angeles
- Alexa Wright – photography, including the depiction of Phantom limbs (After Image 1997) and other works that combine and superimpose visual artefact and documentation

== See also ==
- Alternate reality game
- Design fiction
- Conceptual art
- Fictive art
- Installation art
