= Iris Häussler =

German artist

Iris Haeussler
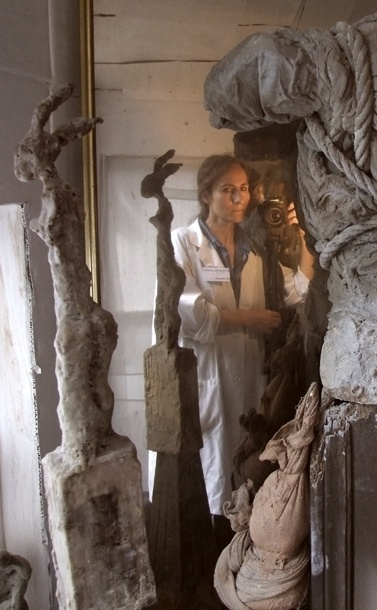
- Haeussler in one of the rooms of her installation "The Legacy of Joseph Wagenbach" (2006)
- Born: 6 April 1962; Friedrichshafen, Germany
- Education: Academy of Fine Arts, Munich (Heribert Sturm)
- Known for: Conceptual artist, installation artist
- Notable work: ou topos – Wien (1989), Pro Polis (1993), The Legacy of Joseph Wagenbach (2006), The Sophie La Rosière Project (2016), Florence Hasard (2018)

Iris Haeussler (or German spelling Häussler; German pronunciation: [ˈiːʁɪs ˈhɔʏslɐ]; born 6 April 1962) is a conceptual and installation art artist of German origin. She lives in Toronto, Canada. Many of Iris Haeussler's works are detailed, hyperrealistic installations that visitors can decode as narrative stories. Recurring topics in her work include historic, cultural, social and geographic origins; family ties, relationships, memory, history, trauma and obsession.

== Biography ==
Haeussler studied at the Academy of Fine Arts, Munich under Heribert Sturm. The loosely structured curriculum emphasized studio work. There were few mandatory courses and emphasis was placed on exploration and experiment, practice and critical discussion. Haeussler's experiments were influenced by artistic positions of Wilhelm Lehmbruck and Joseph Beuys; she herself names Medardo Rosso as her most important inspiration.

Recognition received include a scholarship of the German Academic Scholarship Foundation, the Karl-Hofer Prize of the Berlin Academy of Fine Arts and a Kunstfonds Fellowship. In 1999 Haeussler had a guest professorship at the Munich Academy. She has shown widely throughout Europe in the nineties before moving to Toronto, Canada in 2001.

While Haeussler was trained as a conceptual artist and sculptor, her work is not easily classified by method or genre: she has had solo-shows of sketches, drawings and sculpture as well as participatory, interactive pieces. However her most notable works are large, immersive installations. Philosopher Mark Kingwell notes: "It is an example of what we might label haptic conceptual art: the art of ideas that functions by way of immersion, even ravishment."

== Major immersive off-site and museum installations ==
With her hyper-real installations, she presents the living situations of fictitious protagonists who have arranged their lives somewhere between obsession and art."Synthetic Memories" is a tag Haeussler applies to her major installations; she sees "synthetic" as opposed to "analytic" in the artistic process of creating memory from research, ideas and studio-work. Often years in the making, they derive much of their credibility from painstaking attention to site-specific detail and hyper-realist staging. They are also invariably off-site works.

Initially she adopted a strategy of erasing herself and the conventions of presenting her work as "art" by creating environments seemingly built up and then abandoned by obsessed individuals (so called outsiders). In more recent projects she includes the process of research and staging into the final presentations.

- Ou Topos – Wien (1989), Her earliest apartment installation recreated the situation of an aged man in a turn-of-the-century social housing project "Ou Topos" in Vienna, Austria. Austria. Focus of the installation was the bedroom that had been filled with thousands of tin cans of preserves, stacked on crude, wooden shelves, each wrapped in thick lead-foil and labeled with their date of expiry. Visitors explored the space unsupervised on their own. "[The work] reveals the circumstances of others, without trespassing on their intimacy or dignity. In order to create an authentic representation, [Haeussler] has lived in this apartment for half a year. She immersed herself deeply into this unfamiliar space, absorbed the odors of the house, listened to its sounds and adapted her routines to those of the other inhabitants. When the apartment was opened to visitors, fiction and reality appeared superimposed".
- Pro Polis (1993) was Haeussler's first hotel intervention, staged in a three-star hotel near the Cathedral in Milan, Italy. She covered the walls, floor, window and all amenities of a guest room with a thick layer of wax. Visitors obtained the key at the reception for an unsupervised experience of the space. With this work Haeussler "reverses the canon of sculpture, in the spirit of the revolutionary sculptor Medardo Rosso, [...as she ...] raises the question of overcoming its intrinsic limitations".
- Huckepack (1995: Piggyback) was a hotel intervention in which Haeussler installed the personal belongings of a traveling woman into a room of a downtown hotel in Leipzig, Germany. Guests were offered an upgrade into this room, if they agreed to share their space with this fictitious person. They were confronted with one of the beds being unmade and a silk-pajama left on site, one of the towels having been used, an open suitcase with personal items on the dresser, all conspiring to create a virtual, yet tangible physical presence.
- Monopati (2000), featured two apartments in two separate cities – Munich and Berlin, Germany. These were transformed into different narratives, but remained connected through a single school class photograph, taken in the late 1930s that could be seen in both apartments. Visitors were able to obtain the key to the apartments at nearby galleries (Galerie Huber-Goueffon in Munich, Wohnmaschine in Berlin) and proceeded on their own into the installation.
- The Legacy of Joseph Wagenbach (2006) was Iris Haeussler's first major work in North America and her largest and most complex installation at that time. Curated by Rhonda Corvese and reviewed internationally, this multilayered installation in an entire house in downtown Toronto "The Legacy of Joseph Wagenbach" – Toronto recounts the life of an aged, reclusive artist, through the mediation of an on-site archivist (often Haeussler herself). Initially, the project was not publicized as an artwork but presented as an assessment by the fictitious "Municipal Archives". Haeussler intended to facilitate an unfiltered and unhindered experience of discovery. The subsequent disclosure sparked controversy on the ethics of engaging uninformed visitors in an often emotional encounter with a fictional narrative that is initially presented as fact. Canada's National Post ran the frontpage headline "Reclusive downtown artist a hoax" which prompted Mark Kingwell to deconstruct this "miniature narrative of outrage" and to clarify that the transformation from fact to fiction in the visitor's experience was indeed central to the work. Novelist Martha Baillie visited the assessment, trusting in the veracity of the presentation. She published an essay on her experience, noting that: "She'd had no right to lie to me", feeling anger and loss, yet finally conceding: "The Joseph Wagenbach I'd created in my mind, [...] nobody could take from me, not even Iris Häussler. He was mine".
- The Joseph Wagenbach Foundation Foundation Website marks Häussler's long-term project, resuming from her 2006 installation and expanding Wagenbach's legacy into a fictitious foundation. Launched officially at the Villa Toronto in January 2015, it offers small edition bronzes of a number of his sculptures and a drawing edition to the public. While the foundation works on digitizing his drawing and sculpture archive, and planning on the dissemination of his work and life, Häussler states: "the Joseph Wagenbach Foundation is a fictitious foundation of a fictitious artist, but his works are real."
- He Named Her Amber (2008–2010) was an installation in The Grange, Toronto, curated by David Moos and commissioned by the Art Gallery of Ontario. Häussler created Amber, a 19th century Irish immigrant scullery maid, who for many years secretly led a passionate and enigmatic life. A fictitious company called Anthropological Services Ontario (also created by Häussler) conducted excavations at the historic museum site. Guided tours allowed viewing of the recent discovery of Ambers' personal artifacts which she embedded in beeswax and hid underneath floorboards in the mansion. In 2012, the Art Gallery of Ontario published a book documenting the project, including the controversial visitors responses that ensued about an art work that was initially presented as an historical excavation.
- He Dreamed Overtime: All Our Relations, 18th Biennale of Sydney. Curated by Catherine De Zegher and Gerald McMaster. Häussler developed the story of a former park ranger who mourned a lost love. In this process he created strange organic looking beeswax objects that resembled corals. The narrative then tells of an investigation by a pest-control company. Ultimately, the company's manager himself becomes so deeply fascinated by the case that he re-enacts parts of the missing ranger's work, combined it with his own interpretations and created a vibrant blog on his company's web-site, illustrating his own psychological reconstruction of a world of human desire, sensuality and loss.
- Ou Topos – Abandoned Trailer Project, was commissioned for For "Nuit Blanche" or White Night festivals Toronto, 2012. and curated by Janine Marchessault and Michael Prokopow. Haeussler revisited her very first apartment installation, inventing a grandson of the original protagonist from "OuTopos – a Synthetic Memory in Vienna in 1989". This new character represented a young survivalist, researching nuclear fallout. Without being noticed by the authorities, he managed to install himself, his belongings and experimental lab-like trailer in an underground garage of the Toronto city-hall.
- Sophie La Rosière Project (2016–2022) presented the life and work of the fictitious French female artist of the early 20th Century, Sophie La Rosière. Chapter I, presented at the Art Gallery of York University in 2016, introduced La Rosière's biography and presented a reconstruction of her studio. Chapter II, presented at the Scrap Metal Gallery in Toronto, examined some of La Rosière's art works through X-ray analysis and presented video interviews with experts about the veracity and provenance of her work. Chapter III, (at Daniel Faria Gallery, Toronto) showed her artworks in their own right. The narrative of Sophie La Rosière was tightly intertwined with real artists of the era such as Madeleine Smith.
- Florence Hasard (2017–2022) an extension of the Sophie La Rosière project, this new thread develops the life story of the fictitious character and former lover of the aforementioned. This narrative takes us from France to the United States of America and explores Hasard's artmaking in her own right and the instigation of the intricate relationship of these two women and their historical circumstances. Exhibitions include: "Tale of Two" (2018) and "Apartment 4" (2018–2019), both presented at the John Michael Kohler Arts Center in Sheboygan, WI. Followed by the "Apartment 5 project" shown at the Armory Show in New York (2019) and "Kein Mensch kennt mich" at the Georg Kolbe Museum, Berlin 2022.
- Seventeen Grams Of Longing (2024) The title “Seventeen Grams of Longing” refers to the average weight of a migrating songbird. This project focuses on the lives of birds and the fictional story of twin brothers, Kurt and Carl Pfister. Migration being the theme that ties it all together in the literary sense. It explores the perils that one encounters when making a long journey to new lands - particularly avian window strikes for the birds. Elements of the project included: etched windows with bird silhouettes and maps, paper bird cutouts in mobiles, bird x-rays, texts, diagrams, gilded bird-nests, and immersive installations. Different parts of the project were shown at PSM Gallery in Berlin and at Daniel Faria Gallery parallel to an immersive installation in the artist’s garage in Toronto, Canada.
- Divided Heavens (2025) Häussler’s site-specific installation Divided Heavens at the Tom Thomson Shack at the McMichael Canadian Art Collection drew visitors deeper into the psychological world of Häussler’s German-born characters, twin brothers Kurt and Carl Pfister. Separated in early childhood after the Second World War, the twins grew up unaware of each other, yet shared a profound empathy for migratory birds. Visitors to Divided Heavens were invited to explore both rooms of the shack where the intertwined narratives unfolded through memorabilia, engraved glass and mirrors bearing bird silhouettes and collision marks, and illuminated globes with hand-strung migration routes. These elements connected metaphorically to the main room installation, which presented ornithological artifacts and bird specimens from fatal Bird–window collisions, while a mobile of bird cut-outs animated the air above.

== Non-fictional Art Works ==
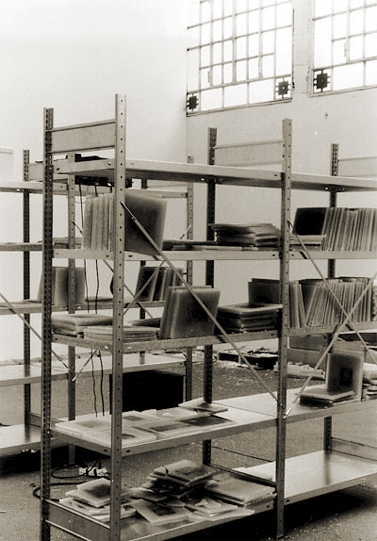
"Archivio" – shelf, on the third day of the project

- Archivio (1991) was executed over the duration of Milan's annual festival of the arts, Milano Poesia, curated by Gianni Sassi. "Archivio" showed the process and performance of encasing international daily newspaper cuttings in hundreds of thin slabs of wax and ordering them onto steel shelving. Visitors browsed through the slabs, rearranging them and breaking some. Over the duration of the show the archive was transformed into a collection of disorder. Archivio was reinstalled a year later in Prague. The act of encasing objects in wax would remain a theme in Haeussler's work to this date. Examples are stacks of wax-tablets that encase the laundry of children and adults, arranged into constellations of family relationships, or panels of gauze-curtains and dresses in which the fabrics' color and texture shimmers through the enclosing wax matrix; they appear as large, ethereal paintings.
- Paidi (1994), a gallery show at the Kunstraum, Munich, Germany contained more than 200 passport-size images of infants, taken between 1905 and the present, juxtaposed with 280 samples of mother's milk the artist had collected from nursing mothers. The installation explored how location, social conditions and history define biographies from day one.
- Huckepack (1995: Piggyback) was a hotel intervention in which Häussler installed the personal belongings of a traveling woman into a room of a downtown hotel in Leipzig,"Huckepack" - Germany. Germany. Guests were offered an upgrade into this room, if they agreed to share their space with this fictitious person. They were confronted with one of the beds being unmade and a silk-pyjama left on site, one of the towels having been used, an open suitcase with personal items on the dresser, all conspiring to create a virtual, yet tangible physical presence. Although the piece comes with a disclaimer – the guests realize that they are part of an artwork for a night – the intrusion is disorienting and sidesteps confrontation; in the words of curator Klaus Werner: "All attempts to unveil the mysterious stranger lead into autobiography."
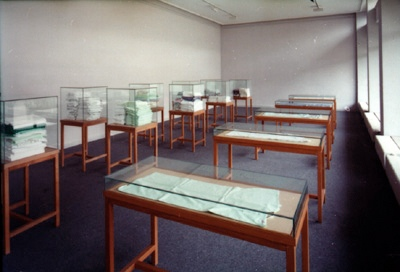
  "On Loan" – Installation view
- Leihgaben (1995: On Loan) presented laundry, pillowcases and bed sheets Haeussler collected from institutions – an orphanage, a hospital, a prison – to remove them for a short while from their cycles of use. "Acceptance and the appearance of a human dimension came [...] from an unexpected direction, when the bedridden inhabitant of a nursing home stated: I am proud to have my nightgown shown in an exhibition." Such engagement of participants through their unique biographies is characteristic of many of her works.
- Xenotope (1994, 1997, 1998, 2000) was a small series of projects that provided temporary overnight accommodation. The first Xenotop in Leipzig furnished a spartan room with bed, desk, TV, towels and bottled water, all painted in a uniform light-grey. Visitors registered at the gallery and received the key for one night, to be spent without further direction or observation. "The only cost is to absorb the emptiness." Variations of this theme were shown in Bonn, Munich and Friedrichshafen.
- Repla©e (1997) A piece of Institutional Critique was a response to an invitation to a "Blind Date" with Maria Lindberg, by curators Susanne Gaensheimer and Maria Lind. Haeussler sent a non-artist substitute in her place, a scientist who filled the large studio at IASPIS at the Royal Swedish Academy of Arts, Stockholm, with scientific and educational chalkboard drawings. The project generated controversy, "...because it was made suddenly obvious how tightly the acceptance of an artistic work is still bound to the guaranteed authorship of an artistic personality."
- Honest Threads (2009) was an installation in one of Toronto's most idiosyncratic mega-stores: Honest Ed's Department Store, curated by Mona Filip of the Koffler Centre of the Arts. A lush, theatrically furnished show-room held row upon row of framed photographs and very personal stories relating to garments, contributed by Torontonians. Visitors were able to borrow the garments and wear them for a few days, experiencing both literally and psychologically what it is like to "walk in someone else's shoes". This piece loosely built on an earlier project Transition coat, Übergangsmantel/Płaszcz Przechodni, 1999, collaboration between Frankfurt (Oder), Germany, and Słubice, Poland, two cities on opposing banks of the Oder river.
- Bonavista Biennale (2017) Curated by Catherine Beaudette & Patricia Grattan, (2017), Bonavista Peninsula Newfoundland. Haeussler showed "Dust at Dawn", consisting of large mylar sheets mounted with double sided tape. The tape holds dust collected from cracks, door and window-frames, lint from carpets, dead flies from the floors of a historic dwelling in the area.

== Institutions ==
Some of Haeussler's projects include the invention of fictitious institutions or corporations that serve as a corporate identity, investigators and presenters of the discoveries before they are identified and labeled as artworks to the public..

- The Municipal Archives, Toronto (no web site)
- The Anthropological Services Ontario
- Pest Control Sydney
- The Joseph Wagenbach Foundation

== See also ==
- Conceptual art
- Installation art
- Superfiction
