= List of book arts centers =

This is a list of book arts centers worldwide. These are university based programs, community programs, galleries, and museum collections, which focus on books arts, including bookbinding, book design, and the artistic medium known as artists books, all as distinct from the writing or publishing of books.

== United States ==
=== Alabama ===
- In 1985, University of Alabama in Tuscaloosa, Alabama began to offer a master's degree in the book arts in the School of Library and Informational Studies. It emphasizes making books by hand.
- Edith Frohock taught book arts at University of Alabama at Birmingham. Frohock specialized in painting, printmaking and artist's books and was the first instructor to teach books as art in the South. Mary Ann Sampson credits Frohock for steering her in the direction of book arts.
- Space One Eleven in Birmingham, Alabama is a not-for-profit under the direction of Anne Arrasmith and Peter Prinz. The organization has exhibited books as art on numerous occasions including the work of Larry Gens Anderson, Pinky Bass, Jon Coffelt, Edith Frohock, Anne Howard, Joni Mabe, Mary Ann Sampson, David Sandlin, Joel Seah and Marie Weaver among many others who have worked in book arts.
- Agnes 1992–2001 was the first commercial gallery to show book arts in the South and one of only a handful in the country. During its eight years, the gallery, owned by Shawn Boley, Jon Coffelt and Janet Hughes exhibited the work of many noteworthy book artists including Sara Garden Armstrong, Pinky Bass, Mare Blocker, Elisa Bryan, Denise Carbone, Al Edwards, Susan Hensel, Jenny Holzer, Davi Det Hompson, Lee Isaacs, Sally Johnson, Susan E. King, Jim Koss, Ruth Laxson, Miranda Maher, Emily Martin, Vicki Ragan, Tut Altman Riddick, Anita Ronderos, Jessica Rosner, Ed Ruscha, David Sandlin, Claire Jeanine Satin and Joel Seah.
- OEO Press founded by Mary Ann Sampson. After studying bookmaking at University of Alabama at Birmingham with Edith Frohock, Sampson says she was steering into a career in artist's books. Her press is located in Ragland, Alabama and continues to produce limited edition fine art books.

=== California ===
- The CODEX Foundation, founded in 2005 by Peter Rutledge Koch and Susan Filter, and located in Berkeley. They hold the CODEX International Symposium and Artists' Book Fair every two years in early February, on the odd year. It is the largest artists' book fair in the world with over 300 artists coming from more than 26 countries. The Codex Foundation exists to preserve and promote the contemporary hand-made book as a work of art in the broadest possible context and to bring to public recognition the artists, the craftsmanship, and the rich history of the civilization of the book.

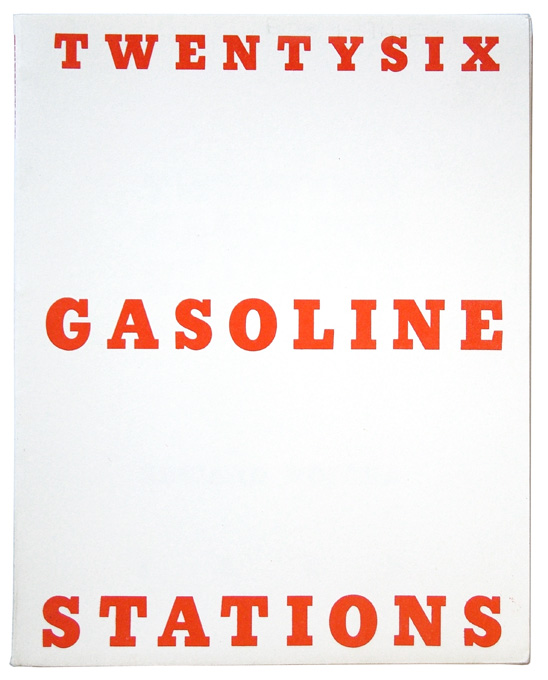
"Twenty-Six Gasoline Stations"

- The San Francisco Center for the Book was founded by Mary Austin and Kathleen Burch in 1996 and was the first Center of its kind on the West Coast. SFCB maintains a 6,358 square foot facility that houses a large print studio, book bindery, and classroom and administrative space. SFCB offers four to five book arts-related exhibitions each year, focused on artist's books, design bindings, fine press books, artist retrospectives, and private collections among other topics. Its workshop program presents 325 letterpress printing, bookbinding, and related arts workshops to nearly 2,000 students annually. SFCB is also home to the annual Roadworks Steamroller Printing Festival, a local artist/vendor street festival that celebrates printing by using the road surface as a printing bed and antique steamrollers as presses for large-scale linocut prints. Attendance at this street festival tops 3,000.
- The Los Angeles art scene (see: Art in the Greater Los Angeles Area) is considered one of the founding homes of the artist's book. "Twenty-Six Gasoline Stations", created by Ed Ruscha in 1964 is one of the first artist's books. The Athenaeum Music & Arts Library in La Jolla has a large collection of artists' books, focusing on conceptual artists' books, and those created by California artists and presses. The library holds the complete collection of Ruscha's conceptual artist's books created during the 1960s and 70s.
- The Women's Graphic Center, at the Woman's Building, was founded in 1973, for women artists to create artist's books. Exhibitions were held there. The center closed in 1991. The Lab Press was founded in the 1970s by Woman's Building co-founder Sheila Levrant de Bretteville to teach printing and the making of books.
- The Otis College of Art and Design began collecting and exhibiting artists' books in the 1960s.

=== Colorado ===
- The American Academy of Bookbinding (AAB) is a diploma-oriented school specializing in bookbinding and related arts. It was established in 1993 in Telluride, Colorado, by Tini Miura, Einen Miura, and Daniel Tucker.

=== Florida ===
- Florida Atlantic University's Wimberly Library is home to the Jaffe Center for Book Arts which revolves around a collection of books as aesthetic objects focused on artists' books and limited editions. In 1998, Arthur and Mata Jaffe donated their collection of 2,800 books to FAU and the Jaffe Collection opened in 2000. Since then, the collection has grown to over 6,000 cataloged materials, as well as thousands more yet to be cataloged. In 2007, an expanded Jaffe Center for Book Arts opened; it included a letterpress studio, book bindery and paper making lab. In 2011, poet and artist Helen M. Salzberg established JCBA's Artist in Residence (AIR) program which funds two residencies each academic year. The AIRs produce creative works utilizing JCBA facilities. They also teach workshops and provide mentoring opportunities to FAU students and staff. JCBA is based at a university, but the center's programming is community-based: JCBA offers workshops and presents educational book arts programming (as well as intimate concerts, films and other book art related events) for the students and faculty of FAU as well as the broader community.
- The University of Florida in Gainesville, FL has a small collection of book arts in the Harold and Mary Jean Hanson Rare Book Collection, including engraving proofs from William Morris, engraved wood blocks by Eric Gill, and letterpress books by Julie Chen (book artist). In addition, undergraduate and graduate courses in book arts and letterpress are offered in the University of Florida College of the Arts.

=== Georgia ===
- Nexus Press, in Atlanta, was a major publisher of artists books. Founded in 1978 by Michael Goodman and Gary Lee Super, Nexus Press encouraged artists to make books as original works of art. Nexus Press was one of the few artists book publishing centers that provided artists with access to offset lithography as a creative process. Though the press also had letterpress equipment, it never was a center for fine print production. It was a center for experimental book production and produced more than 150 titles, including I Want to Take Picture, by Bill Burke. The Atlanta Contemporary Art Center suspended all Nexus Press operations in 2003.

=== Illinois ===
- The Columbia College Chicago Center for Book and Paper Arts, founded in 1994, offers a wide range of classes in papermaking, bookbinding, and printing, in addition to an active exhibition program, artists' residencies, and a lecture series. The center is also home to a graduate program focused on using the book arts in the production of contemporary art.

=== Iowa ===
- The University of Iowa Center for the Book is a research program dedicated to the past, present, and future of the book. Located in the University of Iowa Graduate College, the Center integrates practice in the art of the book with study of the book in society. The center offers curricula in the arts of printing, binding, papermaking, and calligraphy, in the history and culture of books as a field of study, and in the expressive power of the book form. The center hosts visiting lectures and workshops with book scholars and artists, including the annual Brownell Lecture on the History of the Book and Mitchell Lecture on the Arts of the Book.
- The center offers a Master of Fine Arts in the Book Arts, as well as a Graduate Certificate, which can be pursued alongside a master's or doctoral degree in another department. The UICB also offers a joint degree with the School of Library and Information Sciences and affiliates with book scholars in UI departments and programs such as History, English, Journalism and Communication Studies, Religious Studies, the Writers' Workshop, and American Studies.
- In 2015, the Center entered a joint publishing project with the University of Iowa Press called Impressions: Studies in the Art, Culture, and Future of Books, edited by Matthew P. Brown. The series invites works that attend to the changing meanings of authorship, publication, and reading and that explain the shifting valences of print, image, speech, script, and screen.

=== Maryland ===
- Pyramid Atlantic Art Center located in Hyattsville, MD

=== Minnesota ===
- Minnesota Center for Book Arts in Minneapolis has a large gallery space and sponsors a number of artist programs, including residencies, fellowships, and lecture series. In addition, educational opportunities are offered to both youth and adult learners through classes, tours, workshops and onsite visits.
- Susan Hensel Gallery is the home of "A Reader's Art", a long running survey show of artists books. Minneapolis, Minnesota. The mission for Susan Hensel Gallery is art, story and activism, bringing together artists working in all media in the service of story.

=== Mississippi ===
- Mississippi Art Colony The colony, established in 1948 is one of the oldest continuing artists colonies in the United States. Notable instructors are Edith Frohock who taught book arts as well as, Larry Gens Anderson, Frances de LaRosa, Moe Brooker, Howard Goodson, Fred Mitchell (artist), Shirley Romer, Barbara Gallagher, Auseklis Ozols, Johnnie Winona Ross and Hugh Williams.

=== New Hampshire ===
- The International School of Typography & Letters at Golgonooza Letter Foundry & Press holds classes and workshop retreats in Letterpress Printing, Typographic design, and the Book Arts as well as having a focus on the transformative effect of craft on creativity and process in art and music. Formed in 2013, after 30 years of making books as Golgonooza Letter Foundry & Press, the school offers ongoing internships to students. Julia Ferrari established the school after the loss of her partner, Dan Carr (punch cutter, poet, and type designer) in 2012.

=== New Jersey ===
- Rutgers, The State University of New Jersey has several significant programs that support artists' books. The Brodsky Center (formerly, Rutgers Center for Innovative Print and Paper), in New Brunswick, New Jersey founded by Judith K. Brodsky teaches classes in book-making with an emphasis on both traditional and non-traditional (artists') books. The Rutgers University Libraries support an annual event in the fall on its Newark, New Jersey campus, it calls The New Jersey Book Arts Symposium. Founded in 1994 by Michael Joseph and Susan G. Swartzburg, the NJBAS consistently showcases artists' books by artists who reside, work, or were born or educated in the state, although its inclusive focus falls on every facet of the book arts. As well as featuring presentations by New Jersey artists, the NJBAS includes extended considerations of topics deemed of moment to students and practitioners of the book arts. The NJBAS goes beyond state borders and invites presenters from all parts of the world to speak when their expertise dovetails with that year's topic. The Symposium has posted numerous web pages including a photographic essay on a recent symposium on the relation of artists and collectors of artists' books.

=== New York ===
- The Center for Book Arts was founded in 1974 by Richard Minsky, and was the first center dedicated to all aspects of book arts. It has mounted over 140 exhibitions of artists' books. Exhibited artists include Warja Honegger-Lavater.
- Franklin Furnace Archive and Printed Matter, Inc were both founded in 1976, originally as one organization which quickly splintered into two projects: the Franklin Furnace as a major collection of artists' books; Printed Matter as a publisher and distributor. The Franklin Furnace Collection is now held at the Library of the Museum of Modern Art, New York. Printed Matter continues to publish and distribute artists' books, but also mounts exhibitions of artists' books, hosts book launches, and acts as an advisory service to both artists and collecting institutions. Printed Matter, Inc also hosts the annual NY Art Book Fair.
- Brooklyn, New York is a center for book arts and is the home of book artist Judy Hoffman.
- 2007–2008 SDCA (Seaport District Cultural Association) under its founding directors, Richard Sack, Jim Wintner and Florence Wack, opened SPACE gallery on Front street in the downtown seaport area of Manhattan. Jon Coffelt was the curator/director of SPACE upstairs book arts venue. Anne Bean exhibited a tie-in exhibition with Franklin Furnace here in the Summer of 2007. SPACE' inaugural exhibition was "Cuerpos Santos" by Pinky Bass followed with an organic book installation by Judy Hoffman. SPACE venue represented artists books as an out-of-the-vernacular experience pushing the boundaries of what is considered a book.
- Central Booking was founded in 2009 by Maddy Rosenberg in DUMBO, Brooklyn gallery district. In 2010, it began publishing CENTRAL BOOKING Magazine. In early 2012 the gallery left its Dumbo space.
- Booklyn Artist Alliance is an artist non-profit that helps document and distribute artist publications and also curates exhibitions. It is located in Greenpoint, Brooklyn.

=== North Carolina ===
- Asheville Bookworks was founded in 2004 in Asheville, North Carolina by Laurie Corral. The organization's goals included providing education and building community for people interested in book arts, letterpress, and printmaking. The facility provided multiple printing presses and equipment for classes, as well as a dedicated gallery space. Exhibitions over the years 2009-2018 included multiple iterations of the Bookopolis event, as listed at the organizations website. The organization announced plans to close in 2019.

=== Ohio ===
- Cincinnati has an active book arts community that formed The Cincinnati Book Arts Society approximately 9 years ago. Small but active, the society offers study groups, opportunities to exhibit, workshops and a friendly community of artists ranging from fine bookbinders, librarians, visual artists and novices. Visit the website for more information. The Cincinnati Book Arts Society in conjunction with the Cincinnati Public Library has for the past eight years sponsored an annual "BookWorks" exhibit at the downtown main library. Typically held in the spring, the exhibit features a wide range of books from small edition to one of a kind books.

=== Texas ===
- College of the Mainland in Texas City, Texas just hosted a critical overview of the field of book arts called "The Book "ever after"". Co-curators Janet Hassinger and Jon Coffelt selected 38 artists for this exhibition, an overview starting from the beginning of the book arts movement with works by Ed Ruscha, John Cage, Yoko Ono and Dieter Roth to contemporary works by Pinky Bass, Coffelt, and Mary Ann Sampson. The Printing Museum in Houston has a large collection of printing equipment, mounts exhibits, and holds classes in various aspects of book arts.

Austin Book Arts Center opened a "maker space" in a shared studio building in 2015 and began to teach classes in various aspects of the book arts. In Feb. 2019 a large studio was established at 5501 N. Lamar Blvd Suite C-125 Austin 78751. In 2020 ABAC began to teach classes over zoom; a kit is sent to each student. Zoom and in-person classes continue to the present day.

The ABAC mission statement: The mission of Austin Book Arts Center is to engage people of all ages in creative, interpretive, and educational experiences related to the arts of the book.

ABAC regularly offers workshops in letterpress printing, bookbinding, papermaking, typography, book history and design, and various arts of the book. In addition, ABAC provides access to equipment for qualified users during regularly scheduled Open Studio times.

https://atxbookarts.org

=== Virginia ===
- Virginia Commonwealth University in Richmond, Virginia has a large and notable collection of rare and original book art in its Special Collections Department housed in the main university library, James Branch Cabell Library. Included in the collection are books by Lothar Meggendorfer, Davi Det Hompson (aka David E. Thompson), Lucy Lippard, Louise Odes Neaderland, International Society of Copier Artists, Ed Ruscha, Carol Barton, Dieter Roth, Barbara Kruger, Richmond Artists Association (RAA), and many others. VCU's Cabell Library is also a repository for the Women's Studio Workshop, one of the most noted large publishers in the United States of hand printed and hand bound artists' books.
- The Virginia Arts of the Book Center was founded in 1995 in Charlottesville as a public-access book arts workshop providing cooperative use of presses and type for letterpress printing. Begun by Josef Beery, Cal Otto, and Terry Belanger, the Center became the locus of serious artistic activity during the years preceding and following the turn of the millennium when book artist, art theoretician, and author Johanna Drucker became its visiting artist for almost a decade. Partnership with the University of Virginia Art Department through the sponsorship of art professor and book artist Dean Dass opened the center to the activities of college students from surrounding academic institutions. Through the leadership of Kevin McFadden, the self-governed organization was absorbed by the Virginia Foundation for the Humanities during this period and then in 2018 became a part of the Virginia Center for the Book. The current resident artist and program director is Garrett Queen who provides support to a vibrant group of book artists who teach classes and sponsor events encouraging and supporting the arts of the book. They describe themselves as "a community of artists exploring books, paper, and printmaking."

=== Washington ===
- The Pacific Northwest is a hub of book art activity. Notable collections at the University of Washington Suzzallo Library, whose Book Arts Collection, under the Direction of Sandra Kroupa, is part of the Libraries Special Collections Division. Just across Puget Sound by ferry on Bainbridge Island is the Bainbridge Island Museum of Art which houses the Cynthia Sears Artists' Book Collection, curated by Catherine Alice Michaelis. The Cynthia Sears Artists' Book Collection comprises more than 3,500 works (as of 10/13/2023) and is growing every day. The Museum's Sherry Grover Gallery is a permanent public showcase for the art form with three unique exhibitions per year and the museum does an expanded artists' book collection and related festival triannually.

=== Wisconsin ===
- Activity in the book arts in Wisconsin is centered around the University of Wisconsin-Madison. For many years, Walter Hamady taught in Madison, and countless notable book artists studied with him. His Perishable Press, Ltd. is located nearby in Mt. Horeb, Wisconsin. Today, a considerable community of book artists live and work in and around Madison.

== Canada ==
Art Metropole was founded by the three artists of General Idea in 1974 for the collection, distribution, publishing and promotion of artists' books. It continues today as one of the primary institutions for artists' books, with a regular exhibition programme, in addition to its publishing and distribution activities. The Art Metropole Collection, comprising some 13,000 items, is now held by the Library of the National Gallery of Canada as a special collection.

The Banff Centre's Paul D. Fleck Library and Archives has a collection of artists' books.

== Germany ==
Mainzer Minipressen-Messe, also known as the biennial International Book Fair for Small Publishers and Private Presses, in Mainz. Up to 360 exhibitors from more than 16 countries and 10,000 visitors form the largest marketplace for books by small publishers.

== Austria ==
Salon für Kunstbuch, in Vienna, is an art space, where artist books are collected, exhibited and discussed. Founded in 2007 by the Austrian artist Bernhard Cella, it hostst discussions, performances and symposiums about artist books. In 2012 the curatorial initiative Bureau for Open Culture gave a lecture at the Salon für Kunstbuch. Since 2012 the Salon für Kunstbuch is also housed in the 21er Haus which is a branch of the belvedere, Vienna. It publishes an annual list of all artist books published in Austria.

== France ==
The University of Saint-Etienne, France (Université Jean Monnet), started a one-year M.Phil. programme in Art Publishing & Artists' Books in 2007 (Master Edition d'art / Livre d'artistes). Its University Library also holds a collection of Artists' Books. It was the first of its kind in France.

== Poland ==
- The Association of Polish Bookbinders (Polish: Stowarzyszenie Introligatorów Polskich) is a professional organization dedicated to the promotion and preservation of the craft of bookbinding in Poland. Founded on August 19, 2020, the Association's primary objective is to popularize bookbinding as both a traditional craft and a contemporary art form. It serves as a platform for connecting bookbinders with a wider public, including clients, institutions, and enthusiasts. The Association actively engages in showcasing, recommending, and disseminating information about bookbinding through exhibitions, publications, and public outreach initiatives.
- The Book Art Museum is a venue moving your imagination and mind. Trespassing the threshold a following question is usually asked: „where is the museum?” “Wait a minute. It will come” - this is what the hosts, “the mobile monuments of the past epoch”, usually answer and bring the visitors to the world of astonishment and cognitive dissonance. For 30 years the museum has been a kind of squat, unique in the whole world, due to the constant threat of eviction – formally it has no right to be here. Despite the situation it is a member of the Polish Gutenberg Fellowship, as well as of the European Association of Print Museums, and their founders were honoured with the City of Łódź Award, Walter Tiemann Award, „Schonste Bucher aus Aller Welt” (The Most Beautiful Book of the World Award), SPRĘŻYNY (The Spring Award), and recently with the annual award of the American Printing History Association. The state of destruction and neglect of one hundred years old Henryk Grohman's villa, its history connected with some great figures of Polish culture, the lack of support from the outside to save this monument of history – this is what astonishes the visitors. The potential of collected pieces of art and of material culture, knowledge and experience in book art – this is what can be admired by the visitors. Unbelievable is the motion of working machines, the exhibiting activity in Poland and abroad, twenty years lasting obstinacy of the museum founders. Their straightforwardness and liveliness is shocking. Emotions are generated by spontaneous behaviours and unique atmosphere which breaks stereotypical way of thinking and brings various creative ideas. Those who visited the museum keep their interest in book art for many years. The collected items, and devices for making artist's books provide inspirations. Artists' books, books about books, pieces of furniture, old machines being collected for 30 years are rarities not only in Poland.

== United Kingdom ==
Annual artists' book fairs in the UK include:

- Dean Clough (Halifax)
- Oxford Brookes University (Oxford)

=== London ===
London Centre for Book Arts offers open-access studio facilities and workshops in book arts, bookbinding, printing and publishing.

Three of the earliest and most extensive collections of artists books worldwide are those of the National Art Library at the Victoria and Albert Museum, the Library of Chelsea College of Art and Design, and the Hyman Kreitman Research Centre at Tate Britain. The Tate's collection numbers about 4,000 items, includes books dating from the 1960s onwards and is international in scope with an emphasis on British artists.

Since the mid-1990s, Camberwell College of Arts (a constituent College of University of the Arts London) has run a one-year postgraduate degree programme in MA Visual Arts (Book Arts), graduating 10-15 students annually.

London College of Communication (also part of University of the Arts London) ran a three-year undergraduate degree programme in BA (Hons) Book Arts and Design. This course ended in 2015.

The bookartbookshop is a non-profit organisation founded in 2002 by Tanya Peixoto (co-founder of the Artist's Book Yearbook) and sells publications of artist presses and publishers of artists' books.

=== Surrey ===
Founded by Meg Green as 'Atelier Soleil' in Montréal in 1996, Some Odd Pages moved to the UK in 2003 and offers workshops in flexible studio book arts, artist editions, historical bindings and unique volumes.

=== Bristol ===
The University of the West of England in Bristol publishes the bi-annual Artist's Book Yearbook, as well as a free downloadable monthly newsletter on artists' books. It began a new MA degree programme in artists' books in 2006.

=== Dundee ===
Duncan of Jordanstone College of Art and Design houses a large collection of Artists' books within abcD - artists' books collection Dundee. The collection was originally established in 1999 as the Centre for Artists Books by Alec Finlay and now includes over 1,400 books, multiples and ephemera from 600 artists. Several works have been specially commissioned for the collection, often through Cooper Gallery, including books by Richard Long, Bruce McLean and Paul Noble.

== Lithuania ==
Circle "Bokartas" was founded in 1993 by Kestutis Vasiliunas in Vilnius, Lithuania for artist's book creators to share ideas and participate in collaborative art projects. Since 1993, the Circle "Bokartas" organised more than 40 international artist's book exhibitions, workshops, symposiums and lectures in Lithuania, Germany, Austria, South Korea, Italy, Sweden, Finland, Denmark, France, Japan and USA. The "International Artist's Book Triennials Vilnius" is a unique non-commercial cultural project, organised to promote artist's books, creators of artist's books from all over the world, to connect galleries, publishers, editors and printers of fine art & limited editions, the greater general public, collectors and individual artists. The "International Artist's Book Triennial Vilnius" is organised periodically since 1997. Over this period 1778 artists from 99 countries have submitted about 3000 artist's books. An international jury has chosen the best 911 submissions from 68 countries to be displayed during successive exhibitions. During the 22 year of the Triennial history, the artist's books have been displayed not only in Vilnius, but also in Leipzig, Frankfurt, Hamburg, Rheine (Germany), Lille (France), Silkeborg (Denmark), Venice, Urbino, Vercelli (Italy), Seoul (South Korea), Halmstad (Sweden), Salzburg (Austria), Evanston and Fredonia (U.S.A.).

The 1st International Artist's Book Triennial was in 1997, in Gallery "Kaire Desine", in Vilnius, Lithuania. The theme of it was "Diary: Eight Days". 65 artists from 13 countries took part in the Triennial.

The 2nd International Artist's Book Triennial was in 2000, in Gallery "Arka" in Vilnius and in "Galerie 5020" in Salzburg, Austria. The theme of it was "Apocalypse". 138 artists from 29 countries took part in the Triennial.

The 3rd International Artist's Book Triennial was in 2003, in the Contemporary Art Centre in Vilnius. The theme of it was "23 Sins". 118 artists from 37 countries took part in the Triennial. The Triennial was shown in 2004 in Frankfurt Art Fair in Germany; in 2004 in Thomas Mannas' House in Nida, Lithuania; in 2004 in Gallery "Le Carre" in Lille, France;

The 4th International Artist's Book Triennial was in 2006, in the Gallery "Arka" in Vilnius. The theme of it was "Rabbit and House". 130 artists from 29 countries took part in the Triennial. After the exhibition in Vilnius the Triennial was shown in 2007 in Leipzig Book Fair in Leipzig, Germany; in 2007 in Seoul International Book Arts Fair in Seoul, South Korea.

5th International Artist's Book Triennial Vilnius was in 2009. The theme - "Text". The Triennial was shown in 2009 in Leipzig Book Fair, Germany; In the Gallery "Arka" Vilnius, Lithuania; In the Art Centre Silkeborg Bad, Silkeborg, Denmark; In 2010 in the Gallery "Hübner Bokform, Halmstad, Sweden; In the "Scuola Internazionale di Grafica Venezia", Venice, Italy. 330 artists from 56 different countries sent their books for the 5th International Artist's Book Triennial Vilnius 2009. The jury selected 131 artists for the exhibition.

6th International Artist's Book Triennial Vilnius was in 2012. Theme "Love". The international jury selected 94 artists from 33 countries for the exhibition. The 6th International Artist's Book Triennial Vilnius 2012 was shown in "Scuola Internazionale di Grafica", Venice, Italy; in Leipzig Book Fair, Germany; in Gallery "Titanikas", Vilnius, Lithuania; in Kloster Bentlage, Rheine, Germany.

The 7th International Artist's Book Triennial Vilnius 2015. Theme "Error".

The 8th International Artist's Book Triennial Vilnius 2018. Theme "Memento Mori". The international jury selected 70 artists from 26 countries for the exhibition.

The 9th International Artist's Book Triennial Vilnius 2021 - is a conceptual art project. Theme "Absence". “Absence is presence. These are the fundamentals of mystery.”

The 10th International Artist's Book Triennial Vilnius 2024. Theme "To Be". The international jury selected 77 artists from 29 countries for the exhibition.

=== Artist's Book Museum in Lithuania ===
Artist's Book Museum established in 2021 in Lithuania with the artist's book collection of the international artists. It is the first Artist's Book Museum in North Europe. Artist's Book Collection in the Artist's Book Museum consists of unique & limited editions artist's books and artist's book-objects. In 1993 Circle "Bokartas" began to organise the Artist's Book Exhibitions and to collect artist's books.

== Australia ==
=== Australian Capital Territory ===
The E+ABS at the Australian National University School of Art was an active centre of production for artists' books in Australia between 1996 and 2004. It is now called the Printmedia & Drawing Book Studio.

The National Gallery of Australia (NGA) holds 1049 Australian artists' books (July 2007), the largest institutional collection of Australian artists' books. The NGA is also one of the most active centres for discussion on artists' books via their triannual Australian Print Symposium

The National Library of Australia (NLA) holds one of the most notable and accessible collections of Australian artists' books in the ACT, with the collection numbering over 300. The NLA has also held regular exhibitions promoting the collection and further study on the collections, e.g. Beyond the Picket Fence: Australian women's art in the National Library's collections.

=== New South Wales ===
Southern Cross University has established an artists book collection housed in the university library.

=== Queensland ===
The State Library of Queensland holds one of the most notable collections of Australian and overseas artists' books in Australia, with approximately 800 (as of 2007).

The Center for the Artist's Book , part of grahame galleries + editions, which opened in 1987. It houses over 500 Australian and international artists' books

=== Victoria ===
The State Library of Victoria holds a collection of artists' books. Exhibitions held include "Lost & Found - Peter Lyssiotis and John Wolseley: the adventures of two artists".
