= Karen Graffeo =

American artist

Karen Graffeo is an American artist based in Birmingham, Alabama. While specializing in photography, Graffeo is also a choreographer and installation artist. Early in her photography career, she worked as Jerry Uelsmann's assistant and model. She earned an undergraduate degree from Jacksonville State University and a Master of Arts in art education from the University of Alabama, where she also earned MFA degrees in photography and painting. She has taught at the University of Montevallo since 1990 and has also taught at University of Alabama at Birmingham. Graffeo is a founding member of Stare Studio along with Virginia Scruggs and Melissa Springer. From 1992 and until 2000, Graffeo was represented by Agnes in Birmingham, Alabama.

== Work ==
"UpSouth" organized by Anne Arrasmith of Space One Eleven traveled to several venues across Birmingham, including Space One Eleven, Birmingham Civil Rights Institute, the University of Alabama at Birmingham, Visual Arts Gallery, and Agnes. It showed the work of artists Emma Amos and Willie Birch and writer bell hooks, as well as Ann Benton, Priscilla Hancock Cooper, Karen Graffeo, Lee Isaacs, Janice Kluge, Mary Ann Sampson, J. M. Walker and Marie Weaver.

In 1998, Graffeo's photography was included in the book "Visions of Angels: 35 Photographers Share Their Images" which showed the work of 35 photographers presenting their concepts of angels. Nelson Bloncourt and Karen Engelmann authored the book. Among other artists included were, Audrey Bernstein, Gary Issacs, Blake Little, Jock Sturges and John Wimberley.

Graffeo's work was selected by Frank Simmons to be part of "co-dependent" from the exhibition series "From the Artist's Studio-Wish You Were Here " at Florida Atlantic University in Boca Raton, Florida. This exhibition was organized by Diana Shpungin & Blane De St Croix. Other artists in the exhibition included Jeremy Bailey, Julia Chiang and Odili Donald Odita.

Graffeo's exhibition at SACI Gallery in Florence, Italy with her "Roma Series" in March 2007 is now continued in the library, the Biblioteca e Bottega Fioretta Mazzei, of the 'English' Cemetery.

Her work is throughout the world including the American cities of Atlanta (Georgia), Birmingham (Alabama) and New York City as well as Paris (France), Belfast (Northern Ireland), and the Italian Cities of Florence and Rome.

2009 Graffeo's work was chosen to be part of the exhibition "Anthropology: Revisited, Reinvented, Reinterpreted" along with the work of Lee Isaacs, Sara Garden Armstrong, Pinky Bass, Joel Seah, The Chadwick's, Mitchell Gaudet, Kahn and Selesnick, Mona Hatoum, Beatrice Coron, Kelly Grider, and Laura Gilbert, among others. The exhibition was curated by Jon Coffelt and Maddy Rosenberg for Central Booking in Brooklyn, NY.

== Quotes ==
- Captivated by the similarities to her childhood home in the rural South, Karen Graffeo has lived with and photographed the Rom (gypsy) people for over six years. The photographs of the Roma in their encampments present a series of places that are simultaneously foreign and familiar to the viewer. -M. K. Matalon
- Through these documentary photographs, she portrays a culture that is followed by stereotypes as one full of complexity, beauty and strength. Graffeo writes, "I hope [these] images show the truth, tenderness and wonderful contradictions of this culture of brilliant survivors."

== Awards ==
- Graffeo is the recipient of grants from the Alabama Arts Council, the Andy Warhol Foundation through Space One Eleven and the Tuscaloosa Arts Council.
- The 2005-2006 University Scholar award went to Karen Graffeo, an assistant professor of art.
- Graffeo received regional artist project grant from the Contemporary Arts Center of New Orleans, Louisiana.

== Books ==
- "The Distance from the Heart of Things" by Ashley Warlick, Mariner Books, 1997 Cover by Graffeo (ISBN 0395860318)
- "UpSouth" by bell hooks, Emma Amos and Antoinette Spanos Nordan, University Press, University of Alabama, Birmingham, 1999, pp 70–73
- "Visions of Angels: 35 Photographers Share Their Images" by Bloncourt, Nelson & Engelmann, Karen, 1998 (ISBN 1556708548)
