= Mary Ann Sampson =

American artist (born 1941)

- Born: 1941 (age 84–85)
- Education: Birmingham-Southern College; Samford University; University of Alabama
- Known for: Book arts, miniatures, broadsides, handcrafted books

Mary Ann Sampson (born 1941) is an American artist based in Ragland, Alabama. She is known for her work in book arts, focusing on miniatures, broadsides and handcrafted books.

== Early career and education ==
Sampson studied Spanish and art at Birmingham-Southern College and Samford University.

She received a Master of Fine Arts in Book Arts from the University of Alabama. Later, she founded OEOCO PRESS (One-Eye Opera Company), which produces limited-edition letterpress books, handmade volumes, and bookbinding projects.

== Artistic contributions and style ==
Sampson has expressed an interest in the human form, stating, "I have a real interest in how the human figure wiggles about," and noting that her former career as a nurse gave her an appreciation of "human interaction and pain and troubles." She has called her cousin, Ruth Faison Shaw, her first artistic inspiration; Shaw is credited with originating finger-painting as an artistic medium.

Themes in Sampson's work include motherhood and storytelling. She uses materials including paper, pencils, water-soluble paints and inks, leather, letterpress printing, and linen thread.

== Exhibitions ==
Since 1983, Sampson's work has been exhibited in more than 50 venues, including locations in Germany, Canada, Atlanta, Birmingham, Chicago, New York, Washington and New Mexico.

Her work has been shown extensively in galleries specializing in book arts venues including Agnes, Center For Book Arts, The Newberry Library, R. R. Donnelley Gallery, Sarah Moody Gallery, University of Alabama, University of Chicago, Birmingham Public Library, Wells Book Art Center, University of North Alabama and Syracuse University, among others.

Sampson's work was included in UPsouth which traveled to several venues across Birmingham, including Space One Eleven, Birmingham Civil Rights Institute, the University of Alabama at Birmingham, Visual Arts Gallery, and Agnes. It featured the work of artists Emma Amos and Willie Birch and writer bell hooks, as well as Karen Graffeo, Janice Kluge, Lee Isaacs, and Marie Weaver. The exhibition was funded through the Andy Warhol Foundation for the Arts.

She was included in ABeCedarium: An Exhibit of Alphabet Books, juried by William Drendel, book artist and Guild of Book Workers member; Paul Gehl of the Newberry Library and ABC Books Then curator; and Pam Spitzmueller, book artist and conservator at Harvard University. Sampson's work was exhibited alongside Emily Martin, Lucas Samaras, Claire Jeanine Satin, and Christopher McAfee. This exhibition included a catalog.

In 2010, Sampson's work was included in A Reader's Art, curated by Jon Coffelt for Susan Hensel Gallery in Minneapolis, Minnesota. This was a 10-year survey of artist's books including works by Pinky Bass, Janice Kluge, Beatrice Coron, and Sara Garden Armstrong.

== Works ==
Sampson, Mary Ann. A Primer of Oriental Thought. n.d. Mixed media on paper, 5.75 x 6.2 in. OEOCO Press, Ragland, Alabama.

Sampson, Mary Ann. Basil Moon of Ardmore. n.d. OEOCO Press, Ragland, Alabama.

Sampson, Mary Ann. Henny Penny's Lover. n.d Mixed media on paper, 8.9 x 7 in. OEOCO Press, Ragland, Alabama.

Sampson, Mary Ann. Strange Birds. n.d. Mixed media. OEOCO Press, Ragland, Alabama.

Sampson, Mary Ann. Fish. 1989. Linocut on accordion structure, 6 x 6.25 in. OEOCO Press, Ragland, Alabama.

Sampson, Mary Ann and Terrence A. Taylor. Macaroni and Cheese. 1989. Linocut on accordion structure, 5.25 x 3.25 in. Duende Press, Dolomite, Alabama.

Sampson, Mary Ann. Purple Dreams. 1989. Mixed media on paper, 5.25 x 7 in. OEOCO Press, Ragland, Alabama.

Sampson, Mary Ann. srebmun, 1990. Mixed media on paper, 4.25 x 4.5 in. OEOCO Press, Ragland, Alabama.

Sampson, Mary Ann, Edith Frohock and Paula Marie Gourley. Book Arts: Four Approaches. 1991.

Sampson, Mary Ann. Do the Dog, 1991. Palm-leaf book in cigar box, 9.5 x 1.5 in. OEOCO Press, Ragland, Alabama.

Sampson, Mary Ann. One Moon: Two Moon; Three Moon Rising. 1991. Mixed media on paper, 12 x 8.5 in. OEOCO Press, Ragland, Alabama.

Sampson, Mary Ann. Visual Songs and Bone Dances. 1992. Broadside, 11 x 16.5 in. OEOCO Press, Ragland, Alabama.

Sampson, Mary Ann. Heart Song. 1994. Mixed media on paper, 5 x 5 in. OEOCO Press, Ragland, Alabama.

Sampson, Mary Ann. Prayer Book and Singer. 1994. OEOCO Press, Ragland, Alabama.

Sampson, Mary Ann. Ragland Birds. 1994. Mixed media on paper, 24.5 x 20 in. OEOCO Press, Ragland, Alabama.

Sampson, Mary Ann. Aria. 1995. OEOCO Press, Ragland, Alabama.

Sampson, Mary Ann. Barn. 1995. Pop-up book. OEOCO Press, Ragland, Alabama.

Sampson, Mary Ann. Landscape. 1995. Mixed media, 3.25 x 8 .25 in. OEOCO Press, Ragland, Alabama.

Sampson, Mary Ann. The Pink Riviera for Umbrella. 1996–1997. Mixed media, 16 x 15 x 4.5 in. OEOCO Press, Ragland, Alabama.

Sampson, Mary Ann. Howl at the Moon, Shoot Out the Lights. 1997. Mixed media on paper, 11 x 14.5 in. OEOCO Press, Ragland, Alabama.

Sampson, Mary Ann. Singing and Dancing. 1997. Concertina with slip cover. OEOCO Press, Ragland, Alabama.

Sampson, Mary Ann. Rejoice, 1998. Mixed media on paper, accordion structure in cardboard box, 3.5 x 2.75 in. OEOCO Press, Ragland, Alabama.

Sampson, Mary Ann. Mona Lisa in the Heart of Dixie Lounge, 1999. Mixed media. OEOCO Press, Ragland, Alabama. (Description of “Mona Lisa in the Heart of Dixie Lounge”)

Sampson, Mary Ann. Obstacles & Impediments. 2000. Broadside, 8 x 11 in. OEOCO Press, Ragland, Alabama.

Sampson, Mary Ann and Dorothy Fields. Then From These Stones. 2003. Mixed media on paper, 5 x 9.75 in. OEOCO Press, Ragland, Alabama.

Sampson, Mary Ann. Teaching a Bird to Read. 2004. Mixed media on paper, accordion structure, 3.25 x 6.25 in. OEOCO Press, Ragland, Alabama.

Sampson, Mary Ann. Beware of Rising Waters. 2005. Mixed media, 6 x 6 in. OEOCO Press, Ragland, Alabama.

Sampson, Mary Ann and Sue Brannan Walker. Faulkner Suite. 2008. Mixed media on paper, 1.25 x 4.6 in. OEOCO Press, Ragland, Alabama.

Sampson, Mary Ann and Sue Brannan Walker. Pokeberry Inscription. 2008. Broadside, 12 x 5 in. OEOCO Press, Ragland, Alabama.

== Audio ==
- Book artists and Poets 2006 Steve Miller interviews Mary Ann Sampson
