= Janice Kluge =

American artist

Janice Kluge is an American artist who specializes in large and small scale sculpture. She holds a BFA with honors from the University of Illinois Urbana-Champaign and an MFA for the University of Wisconsin-Madison. Kluge is Professor Emeritus of sculpture and drawing at the University of Alabama at Birmingham where she has taught since 1982. After serving three years as Interim Chair for the art and art history department she returned to full-time art making and teaching. Kluge was married to George "Cam" Langley, a glass artist who specializes in fine art pieces, until his death in 2013.

Initially trained as a metalsmith, Kluge has continued to enlarge the scale and complexity of her work refocusing her genre to include more ephemeral, technological and conceptual installations. Along with this new format Kluge is now encompassing sound and digital video along with other sensory elements.

Kluge has exhibited and lectured extensively. Her most notable venues are the National Museum of Women in the Arts in Washington, D.C., A.I.R. Gallery in New York, NY, San Francisco State University, San Francisco, California, the Fine Arts Center in Taos, New Mexico and The Hand and Spirit Gallery in Scottsdale, Arizona.

Her work has been reviewed and published in numerous journals and magazines most notably Sculpture (magazine), Metalsmith magazine, American Crafts magazine, Art Papers and CIRCA Art Magazine. Kluge has also been included in Arthur Williams' textbook, "Sculpture, Technique, Form and Content" in 1995, and "Who's Who of American Women" in 2000 and again in 2002.

== Work ==
- In 2009 Kluge's work was shown alongside the work of Wayne McNeil and Doug Baulos and was the inaugural exhibition of the Paper Wasp.
- In 2009 Kluge's work was chosen to be part of the exhibition "Anthropology: Revisited, Reinvented, Reinterpreted" along with the work of Lee Isaacs, Pinky Bass, Sara Garden Armstrong, Karen Graffeo, Joel Seah, The Chadwick's, Mitchell Gaudet, Kahn and Selesnick, Mona Hatoum, Beatrice Coron, Kelly Grider, Laura Gilbert, among others. The exhibition was curated by Jon Coffelt and Maddy Rosenberg for Central Booking Gallery, Brooklyn, New York.
- In 2009 Kluge's work was part of "Natural Histories," curated by Jon Coffelt and Maddy Rosenberg for Central Booking Central Booking Gallery, Brooklyn, NY September 8-November 8 This was the inaugural exhibition for this venue and also included the work of Judy Hoffman, Ana Mendieta and Mary Frank. This exhibition also displayed work by Travis Childers, Tina Flau, Antonio Contro, Donna Maria de Creeft, Martin Mazorra, Josh Willis, Cosme Herrera, Doug Baulos and Sara Garden Armstrong among others.
- From 2000 to 2003 Kluge's work was selected for "Rising Voices" curated by Ruth Appelhof The National Museum of Women in the Arts, Washington, D.C. that then traveled to The Birmingham Museum of Art, Birmingham, Alabama in 2001, The Huntsville Museum of Art, Huntsville, Alabama in 2001, The Montgomery Museum of Fine Arts, Montgomery, Alabama in 2002 and then to The Mobile Museum of Art, Mobile, Alabama in 2003. This exhibition was included in a catalogue and was also made into a video presentation (also called "Voices Rising") that ran on Alabama Public Television,
- In 1999 Kluge was part of "Four Voices: Echoes" at Bare Hands Gallery. Her sculpture was shown with Lucy Jaffe (painter), and Sonja Rieger (photographer) and Marie Weaver (printmaker).
- In 1999 Kluge's work was selected for the exhibition, "UpSouth" which opened simultaneously in four venues across the city of Birmingham Alabama. These venues were Space One Eleven, UAB Visual Arts Gallery, Agnes Gallery, and the Birmingham Civil Rights Institute, Birmingham, Alabama and funded by The Andy Warhol Foundation, Alabama State Council on the Arts, and the National Endowment for the Arts. It showed the work of artists Emma Amos and Willie Birch and writer bell hooks, as well as Ann Benton, Priscilla Hancock Cooper, Karen Graffeo, Mary Ann Sampson, Lee Isaacs, J. M. Walker and Marie Weaver. There was an extensive catalogue for this exhibition.
- In 1998, Kluge was part of a three-person exhibition, "White Light" at Agnes Gallery in Birmingham, Alabama.
- "Encounters, From a Whisper to a Scream: The Evocative Work of Janice Kluge" was a solo exhibition in 1998 at the Huntsville Museum of Art, Huntsville, Alabama, (brochure). This exhibition also won the silver medal award at the Southeastern Museum Conference that year.
- In 1996, Kluge's work was exhibited at Ormeau Baths Gallery and the Catalyst Arts Center in Belfast, Northern Ireland. Kluge was also a visiting artist at the Royal College of Art and Design in Dublin and at Letterkenny Library and Arts Centre in County Donegal, Ireland.
- In 1984 Kluge's work was part of "After Her Own Image: Woman’s Work," work selected by Dorothy Gillespie for The Fine Arts Center of Salem College, Winston-Salem, North Carolina.
