= Agnes (gallery) =

Coordinates: 33°31′43.69″N 86°49′5.1″W

Agnes was a photography gallery in Birmingham, Alabama, United States from 1993 to 2001. Shawn Boley, Jon Coffelt and Jan Hughes opened the gallery with the mission of attempting to raise awareness of social issues — such as cancer, AIDS, death and dying, the environment, homelessness, ethics, racism, classism, imprisonment — through photojournalism, film, video, poetry, and artist's bookss. Controversial, Agnes was picketed on several occasions, one of which resulted in a USA Today article on December 5, 1994.

Agnes worked closely with Video Data Bank in Chicago Illinois for short film/vido screenings which included work by Sadie Benning, Jim Cohen, Ana Mendieta and Susan Share among many others.

== Notable exhibits ==
- Melissa Springer's "Julia Tutwiler Prison Series" was Agnes' first exhibit. After eight years and 77 exhibitions the gallery closed in 2001. Alexandre Glyadelov's "Homeless in Bosnia" with Médecins sans Frontières was the gallery's last exhibit.
- Agnes worked with Visual AIDS striving to increase public awareness of AIDS through the visual arts. Agnes hosted its first "World AIDS Day" in 1992 with "Day Without Art" commemorated annually on the first day of December.
- In 1995 and again in 1997 Agnes gave solo exhibitions to Volker Seding. Seding was primarily known for his 40 years of photographing zoos around the world and for gradually changing the thought patterns of environmental designers who govern zoo design.
- In 1998, Janice Kluge was part of the three person exhibition, "White Light."
- "UpSouth" partially funded by the Andy Warhol Foundation for the Visual Arts and the National Endowment for the Arts was curated and organized by Anne Arrasmith and traveled to several venues across Birmingham, AL in one day, including Space One Eleven, Birmingham Civil Rights Institute, the Visual Arts Gallery of University of Alabama at Birmingham, and Agnes. It showed the work of artists Emma Amos and Willie Birch and writer bell hooks, as well as Ann Benton, Priscilla Hancock Cooper, Karen Graffeo, Janice Kluge, Lee Isaacs, Mary Ann Sampson, Jess Marie Walker and Marie Weaver.

== Artists ==
Agnes artists list included: Sara Garden Armstrong, Pinky Bass, Sadie Benning, Ruth Bernhard, Kevin Bubriski, Dan Budnik, Clayton Colvin, Paul Caponigro, Timothy Ely, Karen Graffeo, William Greiner, James Herbert, Jenny Holzer, Davi Det Hompson, Lee Isaacs, Janice Kluge, O. Winston Link, Spider Martin, Julie Moos, Hermann Nitsch, Ed Ruscha, Mary Ann Sampson, Maggie Taylor, Arthur Tress, Thomas Tulis, Jerry Uelsmann, Marie Weaver and Randy West.

== Sources ==
- UpSouth by bell hooks, Emma Amos and Antoinette Spanos Nordan, University Press, University of Alabama, Birmingham, 1999, pp 70–73
