= Anne Arrasmith =

American artist and curator

- Born: February 20, 1946; Birmingham, Alabama, U.S.
- Died: February 1, 2017 (aged 70); Birmingham, Alabama, U.S.
- Education: University of Alabama at Birmingham
- Known for: Co-founded and operated along with Peter Prinz the not-for-profit Space One Eleven
- Notable work: House and Garden: Twists on Domesticity, UpSouth by bell hooks, Emma Amos and Antoinette Spanos Nordan, White Graphics: The Power of White in Graphic Design

Anne Harper Arrasmith (February 20, 1946 – February 1, 2017) was an American artist and curator who lived and worked in Birmingham, Alabama. She co-founded and operated along with Peter Prinz the not-for-profit project Space One Eleven. Arrasmith was a student of Edith Frohock while at University of Alabama at Birmingham.

== Education ==
Arrasmith attended Shades Valley High School. She then attended the University of Alabama, and graduated from the University of Alabama at Birmingham.

== Projects ==
=== Space One Eleven ===
In 1986, she and Peter Prinz founded Space One Eleven with a mission to present exhibitions that confront ideas in a southern context or framework. Arrasmith was the director for this facility. The project received support from the Birmingham Museum of Art before it began receiving grants from the Andy Warhol Foundation and the National Endowment for the Arts. Space One Eleven made it possible for the children who live in Metropolitan Gardens to participate in art.

=== Other roles ===
Arrasmith was on the steering committee of Birmingham Art and Music Alliance as well as a participating member of The NEA Tapes through the Eidia House in New York, NY along with other notables Edward Albee, Jane Alexander, Ed Asner, Ron Athey, Chuck Close, Karen Finley, Agnes Gund, Alex Katz. David Moos, Tim Robbins, Andres Serrano, Kiki Smith and Lawrence Weiner. Arrasmith worked with Creative Capital as a consultant helping to determine grant nominees.

She also was a board member of the Alabama School of Fine Art, a member of ArtTable, an organization representing women in the fine arts sector.

== Curatorial work ==
Jon Coffelt was the inaugural artist at Space One Eleven when it was founded by Arrasmith and Peter Prinz, opening in 1989 in Birmingham, AL. In 2000, Arrasmith curated House and Garden: Twists on Domesticity, at Space One Eleven through a grant from the Andy Warhol Foundation for the Arts. The exhibition included the work of Karen Rich Beall and Jon Coffelt. This exhibition also included a catalog with a foreword by David Moos. In this exhibition, Beall exhibited realistic tableau life-size sculpture while Coffelt hand-sewed more than 250 miniature garments that were exhibited as memory sculptures.

Art on the Inside, a self-portrait exhibition of prisoners who are part of the Alabama Prison Arts + Education Program incorporating drawings, paintings, poems and stories. BAMA, curated in 2004, included the works of Amy Pleasant, Annie Kammerer Butrus and Jane Timberlake, three of Birmingham's most promising artists. Suspended in Conflict in 2005 was the work of three established artists that was created based on introspection and the intense questions raised by a rapidly changing Southern culture. It featured Darius Hill, Larry Jens Anderson, and James Emmette Neel and was funded by a grant from the Andy Warhol Foundation for the Visual Arts.

UpSouth, partially funded by the Andy Warhol Foundation for the Visual Arts and the National Endowment for the Arts, was curated and organized by Arrasmith and traveled to several venues across Birmingham, AL in one day, including Space One Eleven, Birmingham Civil Rights Institute, the Visual Arts Gallery of University of Alabama at Birmingham, and Agnes.

Politics, Politics: Nice Artists Explore the Political Landscape was curated by Arrasmith and Peter Prinz was funded by the Andy Warhol Foundation and included Pinky Bass, Clayton Colvin, Peggy Dobbins, Randy Gachet, Binx Newton, Arthur Price, Jules Trobaugh, Paul Ware, and Stan Woodard.

Arrasmith included numerous artists' books into her exhibitions, including the works of artists including Sara Garden Armstrong, Pinky Bass, Jon Coffelt, Edith Frohock, Lee Isaacs, Mary Ann Sampson, and Marie Weaver.

== Personal life ==
Arrasmith was married to Dr Warren W. Arrasmith, with whom she had a daughter, Tyndall.

== Books and catalogs ==
- House and Garden: Twists on Domesticity, foreword by David Moos
- UpSouth by bell hooks, Emma Amos and Antoinette Spanos Nordan, University Press, University of Alabama, Birmingham, 1999, pp 70–73
- White Graphics: The Power of White in Graphic Design (Paperback), 2001 by Gail Deiber Finke, Rockport Graphic Arts 103 pgs. included many examples of Marie Weavers work for UpSouth.
- BAMA 2004, catalog, Space One Eleven, Andy Warhol Foundation for the Visual Arts
- New Creative Community: The Art of Cultural Development, 2006, interview on page 261 by Arlene Goldbard, Lulu Press Morrisville, North Carolina ISBN 0-9766054-5-7
- The Last Folk Hero: A True Story of Race And Art, Power And Profit2006 By Andrew Dietz, 377 pgs. Arrasmith is mentioned several times. Ellis Lane Press, Atlanta, Georgia ISBN 0-9771968-0-1

== See also ==
- Artist's books
