= Sara Garden Armstrong =

American artist

- Education: Master of Fine Arts from the University of Alabama in Tuscaloosa; Master of Art Education from the University of Alabama at Birmingham
- Known for: Multi-media artist
- Style: Sculptures, paintings, drawings; artist's books, multimedia artworks involving computers sound and light, permanent installations in atrium spaces
- Website: https://www.saragardenarmstrong.net

Sara Garden Armstrong is an American artist known for her work in digital/electronic multimedia and artist's books. Armstrong creates sculptures, paintings, drawings (from miniature to wall-size), artist's books, and multimedia artworks involving computers, sound, and light, and constructs permanent installations in atrium spaces.

== Early life and education ==
Armstrong received her Master of Fine Arts from the University of Alabama in Tuscaloosa and her Master of Art Education from the University of Alabama at Birmingham (UAB). She also studied art at New York University and with the University of Windsor, Windsor, Ontario in Yeovil, England while attending UAB. She was an educator for several years at the University of Alabama at Birmingham. She moved to New York City in 1981.

== Career ==
Armstrong's early period with the exploration of sound had exhibitions at the Visual Arts Gallery at UAB and the Birmingham Museum of Art, Birmingham, Alabama. Her first exhibition in New York City was at PS1 in 1982, the Sound Corridor, curated by William Hellermen. This installation began her multimedia series of work entitled Airplayer, which ended in 1992 at the CB's 313 Gallery and Bar (next door to CBGB) on the Bowery, and Airplayer XIV. Both installations utilized mechanisms for movement and sound.

Armstrong's work has been published extensively, including in Southern Accents, The New Yorker, The New York Art World, Birmingham Magazine, Port Folio Weekly, Seattle Post-Intelligencer, and The New York Times.

=== Reception ===
- "In the Airplayer series of Sara Garden Armstrong, one can observe a growing mastery of multifaceted media and the inclusion of increasingly sophisticated technologies. Large hand-made paper forms, hoses, blower boxes and sound are elements in the language she uses, always articulated within the parameters of a given installation space. In her later works, one can see a shift from mechanical to electronic controls of the air sounds-reminiscent of sea and wind-and an increase in the artist's mix of "real" and digital. Wire mesh and paper forms have become powerful humanoid shapes and, when combined with movement and sound, suggest the basic mechanisms of life support and human functions. The artist does not hesitate to seek collaboration with technical specialists and in so doing has accelerated the development of her art. - Anna Campbell Bliss, "Explorers", LEONARDO, Vol.28, No. 4, pp. 239–242, 1994
- "Sara Garden Armstrong utilizes the effects of ocean tides to show us contour in the waters edge, a graceful play of the ebb and flow of the universe itself and in disparate areas in our own lives." - Jon Coffelt for Contour: The Definitive Line, Schedler Minchin Gallery, Birmingham AL
- "When Art meets Technology and the marriage works, the magic can hardly be contained. So we have in Airplayers by Sara Garden Armstrong a remarkable translation of a large sculptural environment into a book, a video, and a reduced-in-scale sculptural environment housed in a handcrafted box." - Judith Hoffberg, HIGH PERFORMANCE Airplayers: A New Book Form Born of Technology
- Utilizing the notion of the trace, as a visual indication of the passing of time, these wall-sized works engage the viewer in a subtle contemplation; whereby the past and the present seem to share the same moment." -Michael Macinnis, The New York Art World, M, June/August 1999

== Exhibitions ==
- 1991 Airplayer XIII, Bronx Museum of the Arts, New York, NY
- In 1992, Armstrong was invited to be part of "At the intersection of cinema & books: photographic & digital installations", curated by Emily Hartzell for Granary Books Gallery.
- In 1995 The Book and Beyond, curated by Douglas Dodds, National Art Library at the Victoria and Albert Museum, London, England
- In 1996 Stiftung für Konkrete Kunst, Reutlingen, Germany
- In 1998 Art and Technology, Bellevue Art Museum, WA
- In 1999, "Marking Time, Large Scale Drawing, Sara Garden Armstrong" was covered extensively. Among the various revues were The New Yorker, The New York Art World, M and Internet ArtResources. This exhibition was curated by Grady T. Turner and included a catalogue.
- Alabama School of Fine Arts – Littoral series, 2002
- 2002 Space One Eleven, Birmingham, AL
- 2003 – 2010 Lucky Draw, SculptureCenter, New York, NY
- In 2004, David Moos curated Armstrong's work into "Contemporary American Art," at the United States Embassy in Prague, Prague, the Czech Republic
- In 2006, Armstrong's work was part of "Contour: The Definitive Line", curated by Jon Coffelt. SHe was one of 17 artists who were asked to define the concept of contour. The exhibit was the culmination of this subjective approach. This exhibition also included Clayton Colvin, Travis Childers, Lee Isaacs and Sean Slemon. James Nelson commented on Armstrong's work in The Birmingham News on June 18, 2006.
- In 2008, Armstrong was selected and curated by Miranda McClintic for 41 Park's "Sara Garden Armstrong: distant views: works on paper." A catalogue was included with this exhibition.
- In 2009, Armstrong's work was chosen to be part of the exhibition "Anthropology: Revisited, Reinvented, Reinterpreted" along with the work of Lee Isaacs, Karen Graffeo, Janice Kluge, Pinky Bass, Mona Hatoum, Beatrice Coron. The exhibition was curated by Jon Coffelt and Maddy Rosenberg for Central Booking in Brooklyn, NY.
- John Davis Gallery, 2009
- In 2010, Armstrong was selected to be part of "A Reader's Art," curated by Jon Coffelt for Susan Hensel Gallery in Minneapolis, MN. This was a 10-year survey of artist's books including works by Pinky Bass, Janice Kluge, Joan Lyons, Qi peng, Luce, Beatrice Coron, Buzz Spector and Mary Ann Sampson. This exhibition included a catalogue.

== Artist's books ==
- Airplayer Book, New York: Willis, Locker, & Owens, 1990; 21x15 cm, edition of 1,000 ISBN 0-930279-17-4
- Airplayers: MULTIPLE, New York: Willis, Locker & Owens, 1990; 28 x 33 x 14 cm, edition of 65 variable copies; signed and numbered
- Fragile Connections, New York, 1992; 28 x 11.5 cm, edition of 200 variable copies, signed and numbered
- Messages from Home, New York, 1994; 23 x 29 cm, edition of 40 variable copies, signed & numbered
- Interiors, New York, 1997; 10 x 32 cm, edition of 25 variable copies, signed & numbered
- Shadow Presences, New York, 2010, edition of 20 copies, signed & numbered

== Collections ==
Armstrong's work is included in collections nationally and internationally, including the Victoria and Albert Museum in London, UK, MoMA in New York City, Women Artists Archives National Directory, Ira Silverberg Papers, Sun and Moon Press Archive, and Sackner Archive of Visual and Concrete Poetry.

== Bibliography ==
- Popper, Frank, "Art of the Electronic Age," Harry N. Abrams, 1993, ISBN 0-8109-1928-1
