= Jules Trobaugh =

American artist

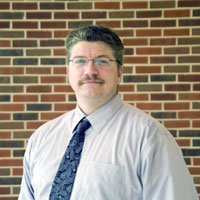
- Born: John Trobaugh; November 20, 1968 (age 57); Lansing, Michigan
- Education: 1996: BFA (Hons) from the University of Alabama at Birmingham; 2003: MFA from the University of Alabama at Tuscaloosa; 2019: EdD from the Steinhardt School of Culture, Education, and Human Development at New York University
- Known for: Photography, Drawing, Printmaking
- Notable work: "Double Duty Series"
- Movement: Queer theory
- Patrons: The University of Alabama Birmingham Visual Art Gallery Collection

Jules Trobaugh (born John Trobaugh on November 20, 1968) is an American artist specializing in photography.

While teaching at Sheldon State in Tuscaloosa Alabama, Trobaugh's work was censored before a planned exhibition. The decision attracted comment and criticism from sources both local and from further afield, including a resolution titled "Defend Academic Freedom at Shelton State" from the University of Alabama Faculty Senate. The censorship was seen as part of ongoing culture wars viewing same-sex attraction and gay marriage as issues about love rather than sex.

== Education ==
Trobaugh received her Bachelor of Fine Arts in 1996 with honors from University of Alabama at Birmingham and went on to study photography at the School of Visual Arts. In 2003, she received her Master of Fine Arts from the University of Alabama. In 2019, she received her Doctorate of Education from New York University Steinhardt School of Culture, Education, and Human Development, who also awarded her a "Distinguished Problem of Practice in Leadership and Innovation Award" in 2022.

== Work ==
In 2003, Trobaugh became an adjunct professor at Shelton State Community College. The college, on the order of its president, removed Trobaugh's "Double Duty" photograph exhibit of Ken and G.I. Joe dolls embracing each other from a public gallery. The figures depicted were "completely clothed, and doing nothing that would earn even the most puritanical parent's disapproval," according to the Washington Post. The college said the removal was because the content was controversial and because the exhibition coincided with the College theatre's production of Arsenic and Old Lace (which it described as a "family comedy"), and not because of its homosexuality. Art History Professor Richard Meyer stated that the work "challenges a common concept of masculinity" through a suggestion of homoeroticism and "not because of any graphic depiction of sexuality." Art critic Philip Kennicott described the work as being "as far from obscenity as the risque is removed from the romantic," and argued that, in portraying same-sex attraction as being about love rather than sex, Trobaugh's work became part of the neoconservative culture wars around gay marriage that were controversial at that time. The Chronicle of Higher Education described the College as having a "Don't Ask, Don't Tell" policy in relation to G.I. Joe, also placing Trobaugh's work as a target in ongoing culture wars. The Faculty Senate at the University of Alabama defended Trobaugh, voting 23-13 to pass a resolution to "Defend Academic Freedom at Shelton State".

In 2005, Space One Eleven exhibited Trobaugh's work alongside Karen Graffeo for "In This Place". M. K. Matalon organized this exhibition to investigate place and location in relationship to contemporary Southern issues.

Trobaugh's work was selected to be part of Patterns of Nature in Denver, Colorado.

Trobaugh was included in "Politics, Politics: Nine Artists Explore the Political Landscape" curated by Anne Arrasmith and Peter Prinz of Space One Eleven. This exhibition was funded by the Andy Warhol Foundation for the Visual Arts and included Pinky Bass, Clayton Colvin, Peggy Dobbins, Randy Gachet, binx Newton, Arthur Price, Paul Ware, and Stan Woodard.

Trobaugh was a presenter for Photography in the Digital Age by The Society For Photographic Education South Central Regional Conference, 2003. This meeting took place at the University of Alabama at Birmingham and Birmingham Museum of Art in Birmingham, Alabama

In 2009, Trobaugh moved to Worcester, Massachusetts with her husband and son. Trobaugh became involved in Worcester civic life first through Worcester Pride, a local LGBTQ+ organization, then by running for school committee. Trobaugh works in the Diversity and Inclusion Office at the University of Massachusetts Medical School.

== Personal life ==
In March 2023, Trobaugh came out as a transgender woman.
