= Pinky Bass =

American pinhole photographer

- Born: Marion Winchester McCall; Pittsburgh, Pennsylvania
- Known for: Photography
- Movement: Pinhole photography

Marion M. Bass, known as Pinky Bass or Pinky/MM Bass, is an American photographer, known for her work in pinhole photography.

== Work ==
Bass, a resident of Fairhope, Alabama, has exhibited at museums including the Asheville Art Museum; Birmingham Museum of Art; Contemporary Arts Museum Houston; High Museum of Art in Atlanta, Huntsville Museum of Art in Huntsville, Alabama; Montgomery Museum of Fine Arts in Montgomery, Alabama; Mobile Museum of Art in Mobile, Alabama; National Museum of Women in the Arts (NMWA) in Washington, D.C.; Philadelphia Museum of Art; and Southeastern Center for Contemporary Art in Winston-Salem, North Carolina.

Well known for her work in pinhole photography, Bass has work in the collection of the Polaroid Corporation. She has taught numerous workshops in pinhole camera across the United States including EMRYS Foundation, Penland School of Crafts and University of Memphis and Space One Eleven. The first of her portable pop-up pinhole cameras was a giant pinhole she made out of a pop-up camper: "Pinky's Portable Pop-up Pinhole Camera and Darkroom". She made this piece for the "Itinerant Photography Project" in 1989.

In March 1997, Bass was honored by the Georgia Commission on Women for "Georgia Women in the Visual Arts".

== Exhibitions ==
=== Solo exhibitions ===
Bass has had over 40 solo exhibitions, many of which traveled.

- 2006: BodyWorks at the University of Montevallo, Bloch Hall Gallery in Spring 2006.
- 2007: Bass was chosen by curator Jon Coffelt as the inaugural artist for the new book arts program at SPACE Gallery in New York, NY. Bass exhibited her Cuerpos Santos Series. SPACE Gallery, New York, 2007.

=== Exhibitions with others ===
- For Donna' Barrister's Gallery curated by Deborah Luster featured works by Pinky Bass, Ruth Marten, Danna Moore, Laura Noland-Harter, Donna Service, Barrister's Gallery, New Orleans.
- The Lensless View: Contemporary Pinhole Photography curated by Diana H. Bloomfield along with work by Rebecca Sexton Larson, Scott McMahon, Christopher Sims, Sarah Van Keuren and Sam Wang.
- (Id) An Exhibition of Self Portraiture, 2006, along with Dieter Appelt, Judy Dater, Nate Larson, Robert Mapplethorpe, Arno Rafael Minkkinen, Constance Thalken and Bill Thoma.
- "Voices Rising: Alabama Women at the Millennium by the Alabama State Committee of the National Museum of Women in the Arts (NMWA) at the Montgomery Museum of Fine Arts. This exhibition was made into a video presentation (also called Voices Rising) that ran on Alabama Public Television,
- On/of Paper curated by Pieter Favier included artists from across the country illustrating the diversity of paper, a medium many art critics may overlook. Each artist featured used paper in some fashion to create their featured art. Bass showed a series of her hand-stitched photography at Space 301 in Mobile, Alabama.
- Politics, Politics: Nice Artists Explore the Political Landscape curated by Anne Arrasmith and Peter Prinz of Space One Eleven. Included Clayton Colvin, Peggy Dobbins, Randy Gachet, binx Newton, Arthur Price, Jules Trobaugh, Paul Ware, and Stan Woodard.
- Anthropology: Revisited, Reinvented, Reinterpreted, 2009, along with the work of Lee Isaacs, Karen Graffeo, Sara Garden Armstrong, Janice Kluge, Joel Seah, The Chadwick's, Mitchell Gaudet, Kahn and Selesnick, Mona Hatoum, Beatrice Coron, Kelly Grider, Laura Gilbert, among others. The exhibition was curated by Jon Coffelt and Maddy Rosenberg for Central Booking in Brooklyn, New York.

== Awards ==
- Artist Residency, Visual Studies Workshop, Rochester, New York 1988
- Interdisciplinary Grant (Regional Artist Project) for "The Itinerant Photographer" 1989
- North Carolina Visual Artistic Fellowship Grant 1993
- North Carolina Visual Arts Project Grant 1992
- Alabama Fellowship Grant, Alabama State Council on the Arts 1991
- Site Sculpture Grant "Big Box Camera", Arts Festival of Atlanta, Georgia 1990
- International Print Exhibition Award, Print Club, Philadelphia, Pennsylvania 1990
- Southern Arts Federation/National Endowment for the Arts Visual Arts Fellowship 1995
- Resen Ceramic Colony Residency (Catalog Photographer), Republic of Macedonia 1997
- Residency, Western Carolina University, Cullowee, North Carolina 2000
- Residency, Oregon College of Art & Craft, Portland, Oregon 2004

== Publications with contributions by Bass ==
- Tangle of Complexes: Photographing in Mexico. Birmingham, Alabama: Space One Eleven, 1996. Includes Pinky/MM Bass; exhibition catalogue; text in English and Spanish; first edition; paperback, 24 pages, 28 cm. The Women in Photography International Archive (now within Beinecke Rare Book and Manuscript Library at Yale University) has a copy (as noted in "Publications centered on single photographers: Books A–C."
- How to make a PinHole Camera on pages 15 and 23 from The Book of Alternative Processes by James Christopher, Delmar Press, Albany, NY, 2001, Dewey, 771. ISBN 0766820777.
- The Polaroid Book. By Barbara Hitchcock, Steve Crist, Taschen, 2005 Hardback. 400 pages. ISBN 3-8228-3072-0.
- Pinhole Photography: Rediscovering a Historic Technique. E. Renner, 1995, 288pp.
- Sleep: Bedtime Reading. By Roger Gorman and Robert Peacock. Universe Publishing, 1998. 96pp ISBN 9780789301123.
- Red Bluff Review. By Sonny Brewer, 1995.

== Film ==
- Coat of Many Colors, directed by Michelle Forman and Carolyn Hales, 2001 documentary for television featured Pinky Bass as herself.
- "Memento Mori: Positive/Negative" contains black and white images. Alabama Public Television.
- Working Proof is a Butoh performance by Pinky Bass filmed by Doug Baulos at Space One Eleven Birmingham, Alabama on 2-02-07
