= Nathan Larson =

Nathan Larson may refer to:

- Nathan Larson (musician), American musician
- Nathan Larson (criminal), American white supremacist

== See also ==
- Nate Larson, American artist and photographer
