= Sean Slemon =

South African artist (born 1978)

- Born: 1978 (age 46–47); Cape Town, South Africa
- Education: Pratt Institute (MFA)
- Occupation: Artist

Sean Slemon (born 1978 in Cape Town, Republic of South Africa) is a South African artist who works in sculpture, installation and printmaking. He lives and works in New York City.

Slemon graduated from Michaelis School of Art in Cape Town in 2001 and completed his Master of Fine Arts degree at Pratt Institute, in New York City in 2007.

Slemon has worked on the production and installation of museum and heritage sites in South Africa and elsewhere. Since 2001, Slemon has worked on ‘The New Northern Cape Legislature Buildings’ in Kimberley, Constitutional Hill Museum, Johannesburg, and ‘46664 A Prisoner Working in the Garden’, Nelson Mandela Foundation traveling exhibition.

Slemon was one of 17 artists chosen to define the concept of contour for Contour: The Definitive Line curated by Jon Coffelt. The exhibition also included Clayton Colvin and Lee Isaacs.

Slemon is a joint winner of South Africa’s 2005 Sasol New Signatures Competition, and was presented with the Judges Award. He was awarded a commission for the first Spier Biennial in 2001 and served on the committee for Visual Arts Network of South Africa.

== Quotes ==
- In 2005, he filled the internal space of the Premises Gallery at the Civic Theatre in Braamfontein with two-and-a-half tons of carpet layers, a work called "Uplift:The Mountain Premises." "By entirely occupying a space with an artwork, an act that must have caused a certain degree of inaccessibility and inconvenience, Slemon sought to probe the manner in which we attempt to control the personal and public spaces that we occupy." -Jackie McInnes, SA Art Times, Issue 8, August 2006
