= Susan Joy Share =

American book artist

- Born: Syracuse, New York, U.S.
- Education: New York State College of Ceramics
- Known for: Book art; performance art

Susan Joy Share is an American book artist and performance artist, born in Syracuse, New York, who worked in New York City as an artist and conservator for more than twenty years before moving her studio to Anchorage, Alaska. She is known for her inventive moveable and morphing book art, architectonic paper structures, and wearable books used in her performances. In the late 1970s, she was part of the CETA-funded Cultural Council Foundation Artists Project in New York City.

== Book art and performances ==
Susan Share has a playful, inventive way with books. Her performance at Florida Atlantic University in Boca Raton, Florida exemplifies her virtuosic creativity in the field of book art. In the early 1990s she performed, aided by a small troupe of assistant actors and dancers, before a large ballroom audience of book art enthusiasts at the 1st National Book Art Festival and Convention held at the Hotel Pennsylvania in Manhattan. In 2015 her art was featured once again at the Center for Book Arts. In 2016 in Anchorage, Alaska, she was part of an ursine-themed exhibition at the International conference and art show Parade of Bears. Susan Share often works with non-profits such as New York's Central Booking, a sponsored project of Fractured Atlas, selling her books in support of the organization. In 2018 her exhibition InFormal Nature was shown at the International Gallery of Contemporary Art in Anchorage, Alaska.

== Education and training ==
She studied ceramics at the New York State College of Ceramics at Alfred University, home of the Alfred Ceramic Art Museum, earning a Bachelor of Fine Arts degree in sculpture. She has maintained her interest in three-dimensional and sculptural forms such as the paper engineering of Jacob's ladders, chambered boxes, accordion books, origami, and pop-up books. Her 1999 coptic-bound book Dwarf Spruce with porcelain clay covers shows a continuing interest in using many varying mediums in creating her book art objects. She often works in collaboration with other artists, Paul R. Stang for example.

== Book conservation and restoration ==
Living in New York City for more than 20 years, Susan Joy Share worked as an artist as well as a book conservator and restorer for the Metropolitan Museum of Art, the New York Historical Society, and the Brooklyn Museum of Art.

== Awards, collections and public recognition ==
Her art is in the collections of the National Museum of Women in the Arts, the Anchorage Museum of Rasmuson Center, The Jaffe Center for Book Arts at Florida Atlantic University Library, the Victoria and Albert Museum in London, and the Brooklyn Museum of Art.

== Teaching ==
Currently teaching at the University of Alaska Anchorage, she has also taught at Penland School of Crafts, Haystack Mountain School of Crafts, The Center for Book Arts, The Jaffe Center for Book Arts at Florida Atlantic University Library, Columbia College Center for Book and Paper (Illinois), and Anderson Ranch Arts Center. In 2007 she returned to the Center for Book Arts as a Sally Bishop Faculty Fellow to teach a master class, lecture, and present an exhibition of her art. Her 2007 slide talk and lecture at Syracuse University was videotaped and may be viewed on YouTube.
