= Dan Budnik =

American photographer (1933–2020)

- Born: May 20, 1933; Long Island, New York, U.S.
- Died: August 14, 2020 (aged 87); Tucson, Arizona, U.S.
- Known for: Photography
- Website: danbudnik.com

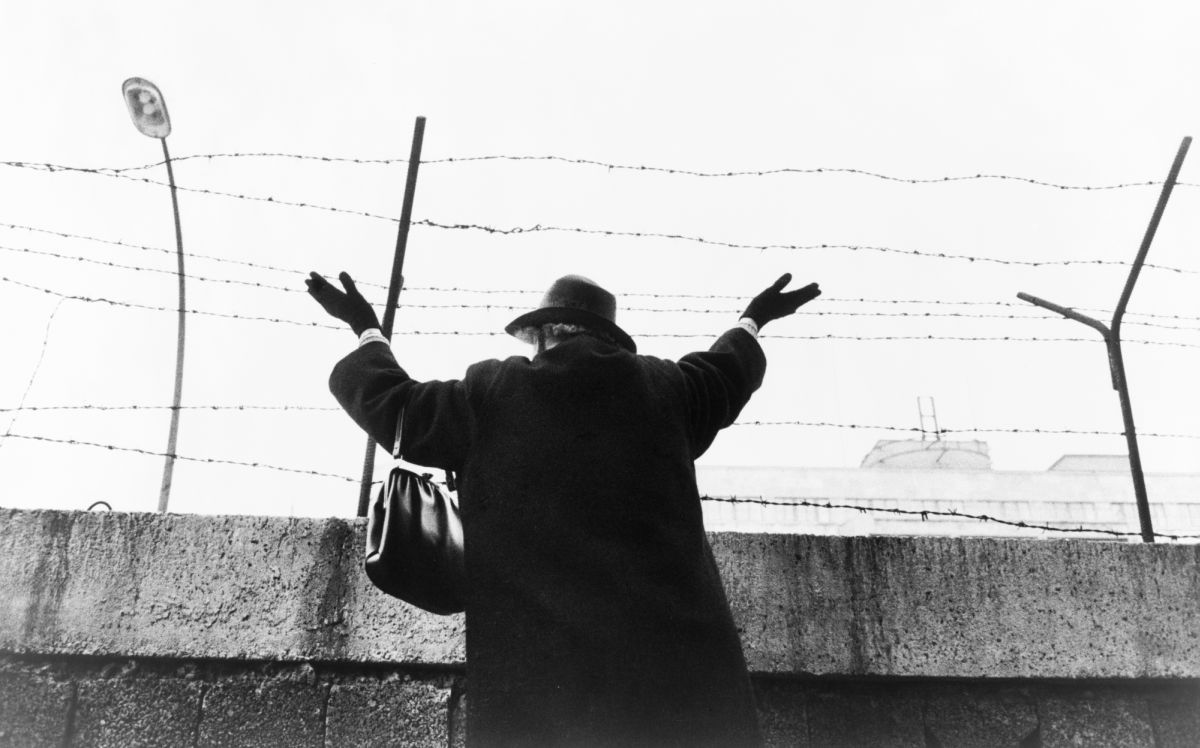
An elderly woman, standing at Berlin Wall, in west sector, with hands raised, after waiting three hours to see her East Berlin friends and relatives (1961). Photograph by Dan Budnik

Daniel Budnik (May 20, 1933 – August 14, 2020) was an American photographer noted for his portraits of artists and photographs of the Civil Rights Movement and Native American life.

== Career ==
Budnik studied painting at the Art Students League of New York in the early 1950s under Charles Alston, who he credited for inspiring his interest in photojournalism. He was drafted into the Army and served until he was 22. After working as an assistant to Philippe Halsman, he joined Magnum Photos in 1957, where his first assignment was photographing atrocities in Cuba in 1958. "As long as you didn't sleep in the same bed two nights running you were relatively safe. Batista was killing about seven people a night in interrogation. You'd wake up in the morning and there would be a body hanging in a tree as a warning not to get involved." He eventually photographed material for Life, Sports Illustrated, and Vogue magazines.

It was my second day in kindergarten and we were playing marbles. This kid who’d moved up from Alabama leaps up and starts throwing fistfuls of stones at this old black man walking under a tree nearby. I can still hear the sound of them ripping through the leaves. I grabbed him and shook him, asking what the man had done to him. He just started letting off the n-word. ‘He's one of them!’ he said over and over in a crazy rage. I didn't understand how someone who was only five could be poisoned like that. As I travelled to Selma, I had that in my mind.

— Dan Budnik, 2014 interview

He was one of the photographers to capture the March on Washington in 1963. Later, Budnik convinced Life to commission him to create a long-term photo essay showing the seriousness of the 1965 Selma to Montgomery march, during which he photographed both Martin Luther King Jr. and George Wallace. However, Life declined to publish his work after devoting two consecutive issues to covering the march using other photographers.

Since 1970, Budnik has worked with the Hopi and Navajo Native American tribes, for which he was awarded grants from the National Endowment for the Arts (1973) and the Polaroid Foundation (1980).

During his career, Budnik has photographed Candice Bergen, Sophia Loren, Martin Luther King Jr., Georgia O'Keeffe, Willem de Kooning, and Dwight D. Eisenhower. The American Society of Media Photographers awarded Budnik its 1998 Honor Roll Award.

Budnik has work in the collections of the King Center for Nonviolent Social Change in Atlanta, Georgia, and the Museum of Modern Art. Budnik also exhibited his work at the Agnes gallery.

== Personal life ==
Budnik lived and worked in Tucson, Arizona. Budnik died on August 14, 2020, at an assisted living facility in Tucson.

== Works ==
- The Book of Elders: The Life Stories of Great American Indians, as told to Sandy Johnson, photographed by Dan Budnik. San Francisco: Harper San Francisco, 1994. ISBN 978-0-06-250837-9
- Budnik, Dan (2014). Marching to the Freedom Dream. London: Trolley Books. ISBN 9781907112478. Archived from the original on July 10, 2018.

== See also ==
- List of photographers of the civil rights movement
