= Malcolm Laney =

American sports coach (1910–1985)

Biographical details
- Born: 1910; Ragland, Alabama, U.S.
- Died: March 24, 1985 (aged 74–75); Tuscaloosa, Alabama, U.S.

Playing career

Football
- 1929: Birmingham–Southern

Basketball
- 1930–1932: Alabama
- Position: Guard (basketball)

Coaching career (HC unless noted)

Football
- 1934–1943: Woodlawn HS (AL)
- 1944–1957: Alabama (assistant)

Basketball
- 1944–1945: Alabama

Golf
- 1952–1954: Alabama

Head coaching record
- Overall: 76–14 (high school football); 10–5 (college basketball); 23–4 (college golf)

Malcolm Laney (1910 – March 24, 1985) was a head coach for the Alabama men's basketball team (1944–1945), the Alabama golf team (1952–1954) and an assistant coach for the Alabama football team (1944–1957). He was also the head football coach at Woodlawn High School in Birmingham, Alabama (1934–1943).

== Early years ==
John Malcolm Laney was born in 1910 at Ragland, Alabama. He later moved to Birmingham and attended Phillips High School in Birmingham where he played on both the football and basketball teams. After one year at Birmingham–Southern College, Laney transferred to the University of Alabama. At Alabama, he lettered on the men's basketball team as a guard for the 1930, 1931 and 1932 seasons. He played on the squad with his brother Walton Laney and was a part of the undefeated 1930 squad led by head coach Hank Crisp. After he graduated in 1932, Laney coached a YMHA team in Birmingham before he became the head football coach at Woodlawn High School.

== Coaching career ==
=== Basketball ===
After not fielding a team for the 1943–1944 season due to the effects of World War II, on December 29, 1944, Alabama athletic director Hank Crisp announced Laney as the new basketball head coach. Prior to his appointment with the Crimson Tide, Laney had served as a basketball referee over the previous 15 years. During his only season as head coach, he led Alabama to a record of ten wins and five losses (10–5).

=== Football ===
In 1934, Laney entered his first season as head football coach at Woodlawn High School in Birmingham, Alabama. He remained at Woodlawn through the 1943 season and ended his high school coaching career with the Colonials with an overall record of 76 wins and 14 losses (76–14). Additionally, during his tenure as head coach, Woodlawn captured seven Birmingham city championships and five state championships. While there, some of the future stars he coached included Harry Gilmer, Earl Fullilove, Holt Rast and Travis Tidwell, and each would later become a member of a College Football All-America Team. From Woodlawn, he went on to serve as an assistant coach with the Alabama football team from 1944 to 1957 under both coaches Harold Drew and Jennings B. Whitworth.

=== Golf ===
From 1952 through the 1954 seasons, Laney coached the Alabama golf team. During his tenure as head coach, Laney led the Crimson Tide to an overall record of 23 wins and four losses (23–4). He was also the coach for Bobby Hill when he captured Alabama's first SEC golf championship in 1952.

== Later life ==
After his tenure as a coach ended, Laney continued to serve at Alabama as a field representative for the University Alumni Office from 1958 until his retirement 1972. In 1975, he was appointed interim director of Alumni Affairs. He started Camp Laney, a boys summer camp that still survives to this day, at Mentone, Alabama, in 1959. In recognition for his contributions to sport in the state, Laney was inducted into the Alabama Sports Hall of Fame on February 18, 1984. He died on March 24, 1985, at Tuscaloosa, Alabama.

== Head coaching record ==
=== College basketball ===
Record table
Season	Coach	Overall	Conference	Standing	Postseason
Alabama Crimson Tide (Southeastern Conference) (1944–1945)
1944–45	Alabama	10–5	5–3	6th	
Alabama:		10–5	5–3		
Total:		10–5			
