= Spider Martin =

American journalist (1939–2003)

James "Spider" Martin
- Born: April 1, 1939; Fairfield, Alabama, U.S.
- Died: April 8, 2003 (aged 64); Blount Springs, Alabama, U.S.
- Occupation: Photographer
- Known for: Two Minute Warning

James "Spider" Martin (April 1, 1939 – April 8, 2003) was an American photographer known for his work documenting the American Civil Rights Movement in 1965, specifically Bloody Sunday and other incidents from the Selma to Montgomery marches.

== Early years ==
Martin was born in Fairfield, Alabama. He was slightly built at 5 feet 2 inches (1.57 m) tall and 125 pounds (57 kg), and though he would climb trees and church towers to get a different angle for his photographs, his nickname "Spider" dates back to his school days at Hueytown High, where a reporter described him as moving "like a spider" during one of his touchdown runs on the football field.

After high school, Martin studied art at Jacksonville State University, the University of Alabama, and the University of Alabama at Birmingham. Initially interested in photography as a hobby, Martin embarked on a career as a professional photographer when given a project for U.S. Steel. In 1964, he was hired as the youngest photojournalist at The Birmingham News.

== Involvement in Civil Rights ==
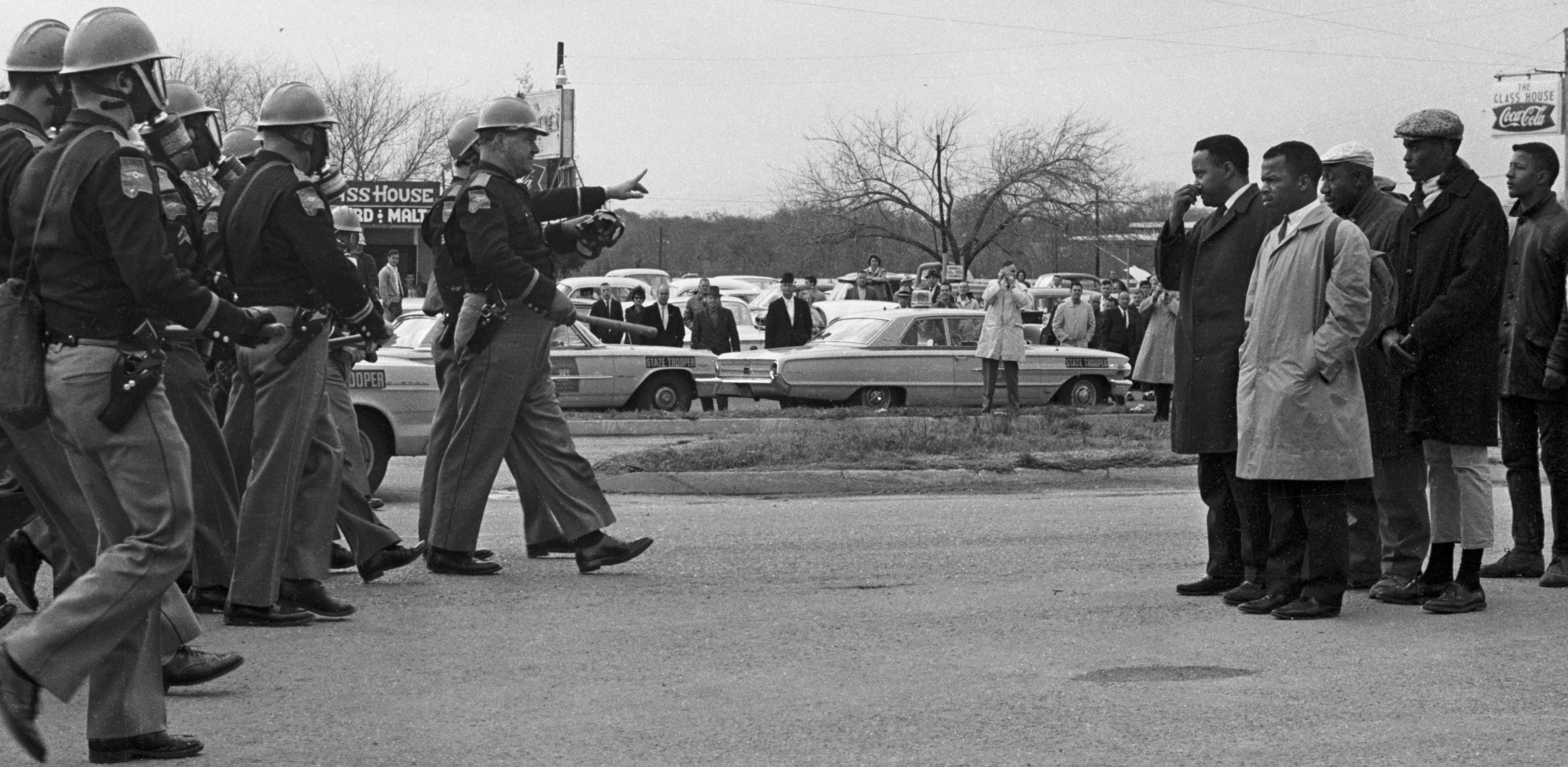
Martin's photograph Two Minute Warning

While working as a photographer for The Birmingham News, he was assigned to cover the death of Jimmie Lee Jackson in February 1965. One month later, he created a notable photograph of the Civil Rights era, entitled Two Minute Warning, during the 1965 Voting Rights Movement. His photograph showed Alabama state troopers about to attack the first peaceful Selma to Montgomery march with batons and tear gas just after it had crossed the Edmund Pettus Bridge from Selma into Dallas County on 7 March 1965. Hosea Williams and John Lewis were leading the planned 54-mile (87 km) march to the Alabama State Capitol in protest at unfair treatment of African Americans and discriminatory voting rights practices. The incident, known as Bloody Sunday, the media coverage of it and the national outcry that ensued, were influential in the course of civil rights in the U.S. Speaking about the effect of photography on the Civil Rights Movement, Martin Luther King Jr. said, "Spider, we could have marched, we could have protested forever, but if it weren't for guys like you, it would have been for nothing. The whole world saw your pictures. That's why the Voting Rights Act was passed."

Martin would join the third march, covering it from start to finish, at the Alabama State Capitol. During the march, Martin took a photograph of an exhausted minister from Maine on the verge of quitting the march. Martin told him "I weigh 125 pounds, my camera bag is 50 pounds, and I [am] walking backwards and shooting pictures" and helped the minister back to his feet. Martin's photographs were subsequently published in Life, Saturday Evening Post, Time, Der Spiegel, Stern, Paris Match, Birmingham Weekly and The Birmingham News.

== Later career and legacy ==
After the Selma to Montgomery marches, Martin covered the trial of the murderer of Viola Liuzzo and George Wallace's 1968 presidential campaign, reportedly telling the candidate "I won't vote for you, but I'll take your money." He was represented for several years by Black Star. Martin transitioned into a career as a commercial photographer working with several groups, such as PBS. He also assisted former Alabama governor Don Siegelman in his gubernatorial campaign and toured with his Civil Rights photography throughout the nation. Martin became an advocate for animal rights collaborating on projects with the Humane World for Animals (previously known as the Humane Society of the United States). In 2015, the Dolph Briscoe Center for American History at the University of Texas at Austin acquired Martin's archive of negatives, correspondence, memos, clippings, and other material for $250,000.

== Personal life and death ==
Martin had two daughters, Tracy Leigh Martin and Michelle Martin Lunceford. He died by suicide on April 8, 2003, in Blount Springs, Alabama.

== Publication ==
- Martin, Spider; Brinkley, Douglas (introduction); Carleton, Don (foreword) (2015). Selma 1965: The Photographs of Spider Martin. Austin, Texas: University of Texas Press. ISBN 978-1-4773-0839-4.

== Exhibitions ==
- Rotunda, Cannon House Office Building, Washington, D.C.
- Agnes, Birmingham, AL.
- The Power of His Camera: Spider Martin and the Civil Rights Movement (Austin, Texas; 8 Apr–19 Dec 2014)
- Spider Martin Retrospective: Exploring the Role of Photojournalism in Influencing History, Carneal Building, Selma, AL, 2015.
- Lyndon Baines Johnson Presidential Library and Museum, Austin, TX, 2015.
- Selma March 1965, Steven Kasher Gallery, New York, 2015. Photographs by Martin, Charles Moore and James Barker.
- "The World Saw Your Pictures": Spider Martin and the Voting Rights Campaign, Alabama Department of Archives and History, Montgomery, AL, 2015.
- Selma to Montgomery: Spider Martin’s Historic Photographs, Archaeology Museum, University of South Alabama, Mobile, AL, 2015.
- Selma to Montgomery: March for the Right to Vote, Atlanta; and traveled to New Orleans; Montgomery; Washington, D.C.; and Levine Museum of the New South, Charlotte, NC, 2015. Curated by the Birmingham Civil Rights Institute.
- The Freedom Exhibition: Two Countries One Struggle, Abroms-Engel Institute for the Visual Arts at the University of Alabama at Birmingham, Birmingham, Alabama, June 5 - August 8, 2015.

== Collections ==
Martin's photographs are held in the following permanent collections:

- Birmingham Civil Rights Institute, Birmingham, AL
- National Museum of African American History and Culture, Washington, D.C.
- Dolph Briscoe Center for American History, Austin, TX

== See also ==
- List of photographers of the civil rights movement
