= Melissa Springer =

American photojournalist

Melissa Springer is an American photojournalist whose work has appeared in numerous publications, including Aperture, Elle, Forbes, Harper's Bazaar, The New York Times Magazine, Los Angeles Times Magazine, Southern Living, The Village Voice and House & Garden.

Springer was one of the first photojournalists to document the AIDS epidemic with her series entitled "Michael."

Springer was the inaugural artist for Agnes, a photography gallery specializing in social awareness in Birmingham, Alabama. This first show was "Julia Tutwiler Prison Series" and portrayed the struggles and class system of an Alabama prison for women. For these photos, Springer spent time in prison listening to the inmates' stories. This work was part of a CNN interview about the Prison and was also featured in Elle magazine.

In "The South by Its Photographers" Springer's work was included with other Southern artists including Shelby Lee Adams and William Christenberry. The exhibit traveled from the Birmingham Museum of Art in Birmingham, Alabama to Columbia Museum of Art in Columbia, South Carolina; and the Louisiana Center for Arts and Sciences in Baton Rouge, Louisiana. The exhibit also appeared as a book.

In "Voices Rising: Alabama Women at the Millennium", Springer's work was selected by the Montgomery Museum of Art along with Pinky Bass and others. This show was funded by National Museum of Women in the Arts (NMWA).

Springer and Jim Neel photographed rural worshipers for Salvation on Sand Mountain.

Springer has published several books, taught seminars at the International Center of Photography, appeared on CNN and Lifetime Television, and has had work appear in dozens of publications, including the New York Times, Village Voice, Elle, and Harper’s Bazaar.

Springer is a faculty member of the International Center of Photography in NYC. Her son, Paul Rogers, as an Academy Award-winning film editor.
