= David Sandlin =

David Sandlin may refer to:

- David Sandlin (artist) (born 1956), Northern Irish-born American artist
- David Sandlin (baseball) (born 2001), American baseball player

== See also ==
- Sandlin (disambiguation)
