= Booklyn Artist Alliance =

U.S. nonprofit organization

Booklyn Artist Alliance (Booklyn) is an artist-run 501(c)(3) nonprofit organization founded in 1999 that works to promote, distribute, and archive artist books and book arts. Booklyn was founded, and continues to be governed by, artists.

== History ==
Originally located in the Greenpoint neighborhood of Brooklyn, New York, Booklyn moved to the Brooklyn Army Terminal in Sunset Park, Brooklyn, New York, in early 2018. This relocation included plans for new education and archives initiatives.

Booklyn initially originated out of several artist run projects: The Artichoke Yink Press run by Christopher Wilde, a Bookmobile artist book distribution system run by Wilde and Shon Schooler, and a Tuesday night artist gathering at 70 Commercial Street in Greenpoint, Brooklyn. Marshall Weber, an original co-founder of Booklyn, remains involved as Directing Curator.

== Activities ==
The work of Booklyn involves a wide range of activities: representing contemporary artists; cultivating a distribution network across international institutions that may acquire work by Booklyn artists for their collections; and curating exhibitions in its own gallery space as well as at other institutions. Education efforts at Booklyn involve lectures and workshops on various aspects of bookmaking, including bookbinding and zine-making. Educational materials are also distributed through resources such as the Booklyn Education Manual.

The intention of Booklyn's artist-run distribution system was to interrupt the existing distribution networks dominated by private dealers. Booklyn organizes the Sass & Zines: Celebrating QPOC / WPOC in Print event, and in 2019, Booklyn participated in the New York City Book and Ephemera Fair during New York's Rare Book Week by curating a Brooklyn Artists' Fair of forty artists whose work addresses diverse and contemporary issues.

The artistic works represented by Booklyn include artist books, prints, drawings, publications, and zines, as well as the archives of individual artists. Booklyn also publishes and co-sponsors books. Institutions that have worked with Booklyn to acquire materials for their own collection include University of Puget Sound, Franklin & Marshall College, Bucknell University and Long Island University – Brooklyn.

Booklyn has collaborated with Iraq Veterans Against the War (now About Face), on a series of portfolio projects dating back to the War is Trauma portfolio in 2008; some of these have also involved collaboration with Justseeds Artists' Cooperative and Combat Paper NJ.

Booklyn's organizational archive is housed at Library of Congress.

== Exhibitions ==
Exhibitions presented by Booklyn include:

- Straight out of Booklyn (2017), at Bucknell University Special Collections/University Archives.
- 'RISE' (May–June 2015), Kelie Bowman, at Booklyn
- Conflict Unknown, Lale Westvind (November 2014 – January 2015), at Booklyn
- Asshats for Shitheads, Sto Len (September–November 2014), at Booklyn
- NO/FUTURE, Mike Taylor (January – March 2014), at Booklyn
