= Jim Cohen =

American Lawyer, Activist, Educator

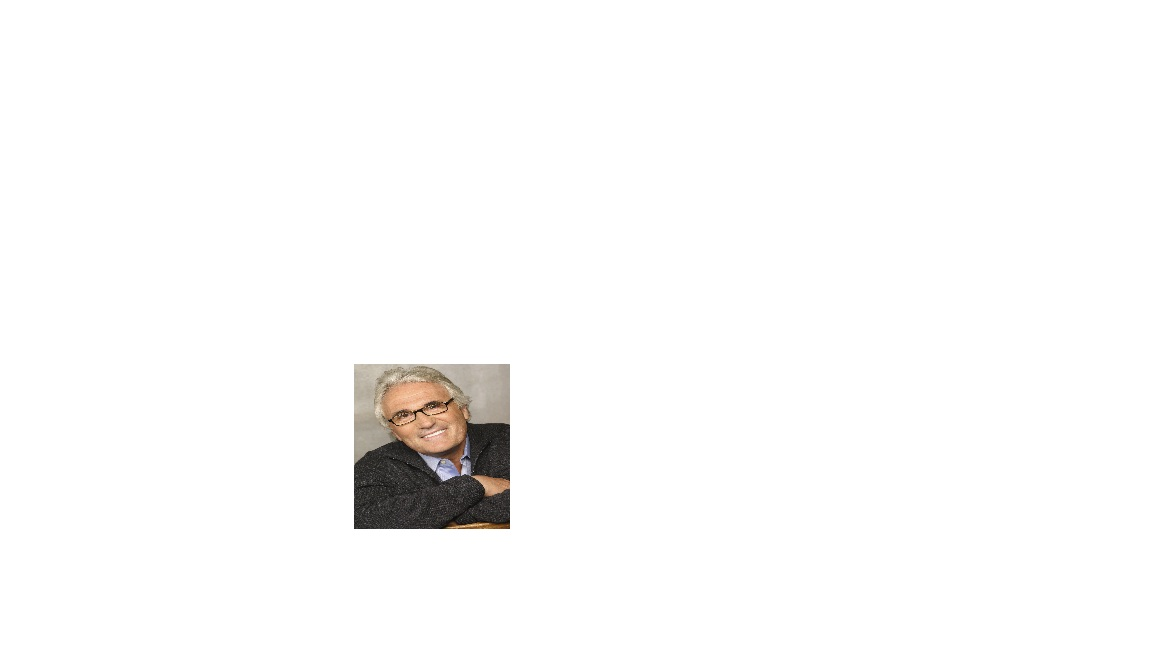
Jim Cohen (born August 6, 1942) is an American human rights activist, attorney, environmentalist, and former candidate for the United States Senate seat from Minnesota then held by Republican Norm Coleman. Cohen sought the endorsement of the Minnesota Democratic-Farmer-Labor Party, but withdrew his candidacy after trailing far behind Al Franken, who subsequently was elected U.S. Senator. Following his withdrawal, in 2008-09 Jim created Access Justice a nonprofit(501(c)(3)),(501(a)(2)), public interest law firm dedicated to providing "low-bono" legal services to low and moderate income working families.

== Student and educator ==
Cohen graduated Magna Cum Laude from Cornell University and received his law degree from the University of Michigan Law School. He has taught in public and private schools in Minneapolis; and once served as board member of the Continuum Academy, a planned charter school in Minneapolis. His term on the board was short-lived, and the school subsequently opened under the name Quest Academy.

Law Career After law school, Cohen worked as a trial lawyer with the Washington, D.C. firm of Covington and Burling for several years. Then his career turned toward public interest law. Some of the career accomplishments he is most proud of include working (successfully) to create rules against false food advertising and to stop deceptive marketing of medical devices to the elderly and disabled when he was deputy assistant director of the Federal Trade Commission. After that, he set up the D.C. office of the Sierra Club Legal defense fund. He also created the Environmental Task Force, a national organization that helped people fight to protect the environment in their own cities, by sharing resources across the country. According to a campaign handout, Cohen moved to Minnesota in 1994 to work as counsel to American Indians and other federally recognized tribes, to use his legal skills to pursue their constitutional rights.Duluth News Tribune

== Environmental leadership ==
Cohen has led two environmental organizations. He was the first director of the Washington, D.C. office of the Sierra Club Legal Defense Fund (now Earth Justice), which is based in San Francisco. Cohen subsequently organized the Environmental Task Force (ETF), a national organization that assisted local groups in their efforts to protect the environment in the 1980s. ETF was subsequently subsumed by another NGO called Environmental Action. Information on ETF is unavailable on the internet.
