= Paper cut (disambiguation) =

A paper cut is a gap in skin opened by an edge of a piece of paper.

Paper Cut(s) or Papercut(s) also may refer to:

== Music ==
=== Performers ===
- Papercuts (band), an American indie pop project
- Papercutz, a Portuguese electronic-music project

=== Albums ===
- Papercuts (Singles Collection 2000–2023), by Linkin Park, 2024
- Paper Cuts, by Mandy Harvey, 2022

=== Songs and compositions ===
- Paper Cut, a chamber composition by Alex Shapiro
- "Paper Cut", by G Hannelius, 2012
- "Paper Cut", by Soilent Green from Confrontation, 2005
- "Paper Cut", by Tobin Sprout from Moonflower Plastic, 1997
- "Paper Cut", by Vanessa Hudgens from Identified, 2008
- "Paper Cuts", by Dave, 2019
- "Paper Cuts", by Nirvana from Bleach, 1989
- "Papercut" (Linkin Park song), 2001
- "Papercut" (Zedd song), 2015
- "Papercut", by Beans from Shock City Maverick, 2004
- "Papercut", by Fautline, 1998
- "Papercut", by Jordin Sparks from Battlefield, 2009
- "Papercut", by Pistolita from Oliver Under the Moon, 2006
- "Papercut", by the Summer Set from Love Like This, 2009
- "Papercuts" (Illy song), 2016
- "Papercuts" (Machine Gun Kelly song), 2021
- "Papercuts", by Gym Class Heroes from The Papercut Chronicles, 2005
- "Papercutz", by k-os from Joyful Rebellion, 2004

== Television and radio ==
- Paper Cuts (audio drama), a 2009 audio drama based on the TV series Doctor Who
- Paper Cuts (radio show), a British show presented by Kate Thornton
- "Paper Cut", a character in the TV series The Adventures of Pete & Pete

== Other uses ==
- Papercut (comics), a fictional DC Comics character
- Papercut, a webcomic by Michael Cho
- Papercutz (publisher), an American publisher of family-friendly comics and graphic novels

== See also ==
- Paper cut bug, in computing, any easily fixable but highly annoying usability bug
- The Papercut Chronicles, a 2005 album by Gym Class Heroes
- The Papercut Chronicles II, a 2011 album by Gym Class Heroes
- Papercuts Theater, a 2010 album by Burning Star Core
- Papercutting, the art of creating paper designs
- Paper cutter, an office tool to cut paper with a straight edge
