= Ragland, Alabama =

- Town
- Location of Ragland in St. Clair County, Alabama.
- Coordinates: 33°45′06″N 86°07′22″W
- Country: United States
- State: Alabama
- County: St. Clair

Area
  - Total: 16.84 sq mi (43.61 km^{2})
  - Land: 16.79 sq mi (43.48 km^{2})
  - Water: 0.050 sq mi (0.13 km^{2})
- Elevation: 495 ft (151 m)

Population (2020)
  - Total: 1,693
  - Density: 100.9/sq mi (38.94/km^{2})
- Time zone: UTC−6 (Central (CST))
  - Summer (DST): UTC−5 (CDT)
- ZIP code: 35131
- Area code: 205, 659
- FIPS code: 01-63216
- GNIS feature ID: 2407169
- Website: www.townofragland.org

Ragland is a town in St. Clair County, Alabama, United States southeast of Ashville. It incorporated in 1899. At the 2020 census, the population was 1,693, up slightly from 1,639 in 2010. It is part of the Birmingham-Hoover-Cullman Combined Statistical Area.

== 1994 Tornado ==
An F4 tornado struck from the southwest on Palm Sunday, March 27, 1994, at 10:55 a.m. At 11:27 a.m., the National Weather Service of Birmingham issued a tornado warning for northern Calhoun, southeastern Etowah, and southern Cherokee counties. Twelve minutes later, the tornado destroyed Piedmont's Goshen United Methodist Church.

== Geography ==
According to the U.S. Census Bureau, the town has a total area of 16.9 square miles (44 km^{2}), of which 16.8 square miles (44 km^{2}) is land and 0.1 square miles (0.26 km^{2}) (0.71%) is water.

== Demographics ==
Historical population
Census	Pop.	Note	%±
1900	309		—
1910	483		56.3%
1920	613		26.9%
1930	981		60.0%
1940	1,070		9.1%
1950	1,008		−5.8%
1960	1,166		15.7%
1970	1,239		6.3%
1980	1,860		50.1%
1990	1,807		−2.8%
2000	1,918		6.1%
2010	1,639		−14.5%
2020	1,693		3.3%
U.S. Decennial Census; 2013 Estimate

=== 2020 census ===
As of the 2020 census, Ragland had a population of 1,693. The median age was 41.5 years. 23.7% of residents were under the age of 18 and 17.6% of residents were 65 years of age or older. For every 100 females there were 95.0 males, and for every 100 females age 18 and over there were 89.9 males age 18 and over.

0.0% of residents lived in urban areas, while 100.0% lived in rural areas.

There were 670 households and 453 families in Ragland, of which 33.6% had children under the age of 18 living in them. Of all households, 40.7% were married-couple households, 19.9% were households with a male householder and no spouse or partner present, and 33.0% were households with a female householder and no spouse or partner present. About 28.9% of all households were made up of individuals and 14.3% had someone living alone who was 65 years of age or older.

There were 762 housing units, of which 12.1% were vacant. The homeowner vacancy rate was 1.6% and the rental vacancy rate was 8.6%.

Ragland racial composition
Race	Num.	Perc.
White (non-Hispanic)	1,378	81.39%
Black or African American (non-Hispanic)	180	10.63%
Native American	1	0.06%
Asian	2	0.12%
Other/Mixed	112	6.62%
Hispanic or Latino	20	1.18%

=== 2010 census ===
As of the census of 2010, there were 1,639 people, 648 households, and 467 families living in the town. The population density was 97.6 inhabitants per square mile (37.7/km^{2}). There were 752 housing units at an average density of 44.8 per square mile (17.3/km^{2}). The racial makeup of the town was 82.8% White, 15.4% Black or African American, 0.1% Native American, 0.1% Asian, 0.8% from other races, and 0.9% from two or more races.

There were 648 households, out of which 27.0% had children under the age of 18 living with them, 52.3% were married couples living together, 15.1% had a female householder with no husband present, and 27.9% were non-families. 25.8% of all households were made up of individuals, and 12.8% had someone living alone who was 65 years of age or older. The average household size was 2.53 and the average family size was 3.02.

In the town, the age distribution of the population shows 22.5% under the age of 18, 11.0% from 18 to 24, 23.0% from 25 to 44, 27.6% from 45 to 64, and 15.8% who were 65 years of age or older. The median age was 40.1 years. For every 100 females, there were 91.5 males. For every 100 females age 18 and over, there were 98.2 males.

The median income for a household in the town was $32,292, and the median income for a family was $46,705. Males had a median income of $52,593 versus $26,901 for females. The per capita income for the town was $16,690. About 15.5% of families and 21.1% of the population were below the poverty line, including 30.5% of those under age 18 and 10.1% of those age 65 or over.

=== 2000 census ===
As of the census of 2000, there were 1,918 people, 729 households, and 567 families living in the town. The population density was 114.5 inhabitants per square mile (44.2/km^{2}). There were 840 housing units at an average density of 50.1 per square mile (19.3/km^{2}). The racial makeup of the town was 82.17% White, 17.00% Black or African American, 0.05% Native American, 0.05% Asian, 0.10% from other races, and 0.63% from two or more races.

There were 729 households, out of which 36.4% had children under the age of 18 living with them, 56.9% were married couples living together, 15.8% had a female householder with no husband present, and 22.2% were non-families. 21.0% of all households were made up of individuals, and 11.4% had someone living alone who was 65 years of age or older. The average household size was 2.63 and the average family size was 3.00.

In the town, the age distribution of the population shows 26.2% under the age of 18, 9.7% from 18 to 24, 28.6% from 25 to 44, 21.4% from 45 to 64, and 14.2% who were 65 years of age or older. The median age was 36 years. For every 100 females, there were 90.7 males. For every 100 females age 18 and over, there were 82.9 males.

The median income for a household in the town was $30,152, and the median income for a family was $36,034. Males had a median income of $27,468 versus $21,250 for females. The per capita income for the town was $12,531. About 15.3% of families and 18.8% of the population were below the poverty line, including 22.3% of those under age 18 and 21.2% of those age 65 or over.

== Education ==
- St. Clair County School District
  - Ragland School
    - Principal: Jennifer B. Ball
      - Counselor: Mary Jane McCullars
    - Mascot: Devil
    - Colors: Purple and Old Gold

== Notable people ==
- Malcolm Laney, former coach for the University of Alabama and Woodlawn High School
- Mary Ann Sampson, artist
- Ray Treadaway, Major League Baseball player for the Washington Senators
- Rudy York, Major League Baseball player
