= Sue Brannan Walker =

American poet

- Awards: Adèle Mellen Prize (2013)

Academic background
- Education: University of Alabama; Tulane University

Academic work
- Institutions: University of South Alabama

Sue Brannan Walker (born 1940) is a poet, author and editor. In 2015 she is the Stokes Distinguished Professor of Creative Writing at the University of South Alabama. She is a former Poet Laureate of Alabama.

== Early life and education ==
Walker studied at the University of Alabama, earning a B.S. She then earned an MEd, M.A. and PhD at Tulane University.

== Career ==
Walker worked as an assistant professor in the English department at the University of South Alabama in 1980. She founded the literary journal Negative capability in 1981 and served as its editor.

Walker became an associate professor at the University of South Alabama in 1985 and a full professor in 1991. In 1999 she chaired the department, and 2007 was named Stokes Distinguished Professor of Creative Writing.

From 2003 to 2012, Walker served as the poet laureate of Alabama. She is the author of five poetry collections.

== Negative Capability Press ==
Walker created Negative Capability Press, a small press publishing house which is based in Mobile, Alabama. The company has published more than 40 books, many by nationally recognized authors and poets. A number of these were collections for which Walker served as editor, including Ways of Knowing: Essays on Marge Piercy in 1991, Life on the Line: Selections on Words and Healing in 1992, and Whatever Remembers Us: An Anthology of Alabama Poetry in 2007. Several of the books have received notable recognition: Irene Latham's What Came Before (2007) won the Independent Book Award in Poetry in 2007 and John Davis Jr.'s work was included in the 2015 Poetry House exhibit in New York City. The publisher sponsors an annual international book contest; the prize in 2015 was $2000 and a publishing contract.

As 2012, Walker continued to head up the organization.
