= Randy West (photographer) =

American fine art photographer (born 1960)

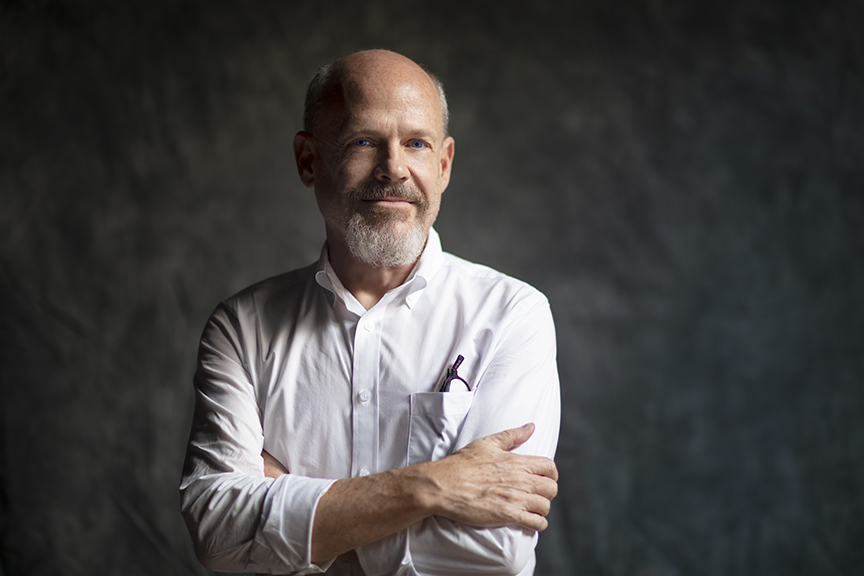
Randy West, American artist, photographer

Randy West (born 1960 in Indianapolis, Indiana) is an American fine art photographer. West is also on the faculty of the School of Visual Arts in Manhattan, New York, and a director of the school's Master of Fine Arts program for photography, video, and related media.

== Exhibitions ==
Individual exhibitions have appeared at the Bruce Silverstein Gallery in New York, Craig Krull Gallery in Los Angeles Jan Kesner Gallery in Los Angeles, the Yancey Richardson Gallery in New York, the Stephen Wirtz Gallery in San Francisco, the Houston Center for Photography, and as part of the Here Theater Project. His work has also appeared in group exhibitions, including exhibitions with the Massachusetts Museum of Contemporary Art, the International Center of Photography, the Museum of Contemporary Art San Diego, the Center for Creative Photography in Tucson, and the Marlborough Gallery.

== Exhibitions ==
Among others:

=== Solo ===
- 2002 Yancey Richardson Gallery, New York, NY, Pretty.
- 2006 Jan Kesner Gallery, Los Angeles, CA, Bird Rabbit Snake.
- 2007 Bruce Silverstein Gallery, New York, NY, Bird Rabbit Snake.
- 2011 Bruce Silverstein Gallery, New York, NY, Tethered.
- 2015 Craig Krull Gallery, Los Angeles, CA, Works on Paper.

=== Group ===
- 2002 Aquaria, Kunstsammlungen Chemnitz, Germany, Aquaria, International Academy of Fine Arts, Salzburg, Austria, Oceans, National Resource Defense Council, [Some] Photography [Abstract], Larry Becker Contemporary Art, Philadelphia, PA
- 2007 Enlightened Development, Architecture + Design Museum, Los Angeles, CA
- 2008 Framing AIDS, Queens Museum, Queens, NY
- 2010 The Edge of Vision: Abstraction in Contemporary Photography, Center for Creative Photography, The University of Arizona, Tucson, AZ
- 2021 Tiger Strikes Asteroid, Brooklyn, NY After Our Bodies Meet
