= Florida Atlantic University Library =

Coordinates: 26°22′18″N 80°06′16″W

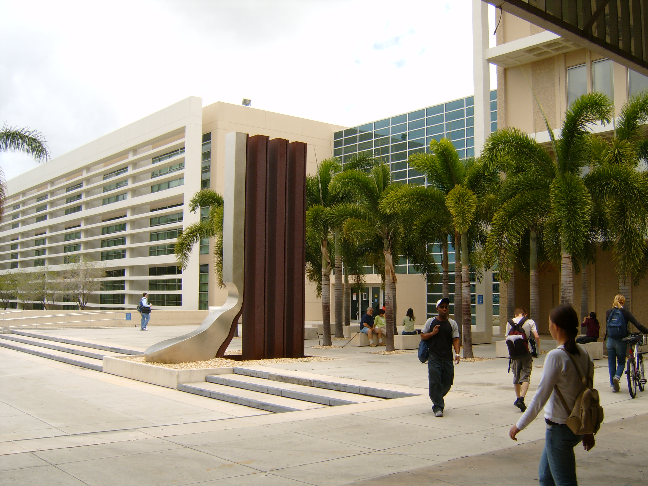
The S.E. Wimberly Library on the Boca Raton Campus of Florida Atlantic University

The Florida Atlantic University Libraries are a set of libraries in Florida Atlantic University. They comprise a main library on the Boca Raton Campus, the University College Library at the Davie campus, the Broward County Main Library, the FAU Harbor Branch Library, and the John D. MacArthur Campus Library in Jupiter.

== Branches ==
=== S.E. Wimberly Library ===
The S.E. Wimberly Library is located on FAU's main campus and main library in Boca Raton. In 1963, the facility was constructed atop the abandoned structures of the Boca Raton Army Air Field, a United States Army Air Forces airfield used during World War II.

The library is named in honor of Stanley E. Wimberly, who passed on November 1, 1974. Stanley Wimberly was a well-renowned figure at Florida Atlantic University. Wimberly began as the Dean of Social Sciences at FAU in 1964, before becoming the Dean of Academic Affairs in May 1967. Originally a five-story building, the library opened on September 14, 1964, not only housing the collection but also housing offices for staff. The library only occupied the three middle floors; the other two were home to the President, Dean of Academic Affairs, Colleges of Business and Education, as well as the Administrative Affairs offices. Throughout its history, the library has grown as the university's population has grown. There were only 30 students in the first graduating class in 1965. The university officially became a four-year institution in 1984 when it admitted 257 freshmen as its charter freshman class. In the following year, the library underwent its first renovation. All non-library staff offices were removed from the library in 1985, as were the library staff's offices, which were relocated to a three-story, 86,268-square-foot addition to the library. The new wing was connected to the old building by a 60-by-80-foot atrium. This would later become the lobby. Construction of this new wing was completed in November 1985, but it was not ready for students until July 1986. At the same time, a sculpture was added outside the library called "Collective Memory" by Dick Cruser. This sculpture is made of stainless steel and can still be seen outside the library today. The library would not see any more renovations for another 20 years. In 2005, FAU's enrollment was up to about 25,000 students, and it required the library to expand again to accommodate the increase. Another wing was added to the library called the Paul C. Wimbish Wing. An addition of 22,000 square feet was completed in the winter of 2007 at a cost of $5 million.

This main library houses about 3.7 million items including print and online books, periodicals, government documents, maps, media, and other materials. In addition to those traditional formats, the library also provides access to over 500 databases. Additionally, the FAU Library offers a virtual library that includes access to over 80,000 texts, including journals, newspapers, and Government Documents.

The Wimberly Library was designated a Federal Depository in 1963, as well as a State of Florida documents depository. The library receives most government publications either in print or electronically. Various other government resources, such as official websites and digital collections, can be accessed through the Government Documents webpages.

=== Jaffe Center for Book Arts ===
The Jaffe Center for Book Arts is also part of the Florida Atlantic University Boca Raton campus library. The collection was donated to FAU in 1998 by Arthur Jaffe, who collected books for over fifty years. The Jaffe Collection focuses on books as objects of art, over their content, and includes over 6,000 books, all of which Jaffe selected for various aesthetic reasons. The Jaffe Collection of Book Arts (JCBA) houses a letterpress studio, a paper lab, and a book studio. The JCBA is home to various exhibits, workshops, and events.

Rental space is available at The Jaffe Center Book Arts Studio for both Assisted and Independent Studio Time. The Jaffe Center also educates both students and the public on topics such as bookbinding, book structures, boxmaking, paper decoration, and letterpress printing. The Jaffe Center for Book Arts serves as the core of the book arts community in South Florida.

=== MacArthur Campus Library ===
The John D. MacArthur Campus Library is located on the John D. MacArthur Campus in Jupiter, Florida. This library exists to promote the academic curriculum of the Harriet L. Wilkes Honors College also located on the campus. There are approximately 96,000 volumes in print occupying two floors including published senior Honours Theses titles from 2002 to the present and nearly 6,000 media items in the library's collection. In addition, the library maintains several esoteric special collections such as their Bollywood Film Collection and their Zombie Film Collection. The library hosts two blogs, the Art Blog and Science Blog which are updated on a weekly basis.

== Collections ==
The university's Digital Library makes accessible special collections and scholarship digital collections that support the teaching and research of the faculty and students. They feature digital images, manuscripts, letters, streaming videos, electronic theses, dissertations, finding aids, photographs, maps, and other research, teaching, and learning material, both those at FAU, and those at partner institutions.

=== Spirit of America Collection ===
One such special collection offered by the FAU Library is the Marvin and Sybil Weiner Spirit of America Collection. Marvin and Sybil Weiner donated the collection to FAU in 2006. Weiner was inspired to create the collection by obtaining materials that may have been found in the libraries of men such as Benjamin Franklin and John Adams. The Spirit of America Collection comprises over 13,000 items. The holdings in this collection include: rare books, manuscripts, pamphlets, historical newspapers, and journals. The Spirit of America Collection allows faculty and students access to materials dating back to the 15th century. Historical time periods covered by the Spirit of America range from colonial America, to the British Government, and even philosophy. The collection is currently housed in the S.E. Wimberly Library on the fifth floor. The items in the collection can be seen on display or with an appointment with the Special Collections librarians for research reasons.

This collection is broken down into five different subjects: American Colonialism, United States Government, British History, French History, and Philosophy.

=== Recorded Sound Archives ===
The FAU S.E. Wimberly Library also offers a Recorded Sound Archives(RSA). These archives include Jazz, Judaic, and Vintage recordings totaling close to 150,000 and are still in the process of being itemized and digitized. The materials in the Sound Archives are in a variety of mediums from phonographs to CDs. Established in 2002 as a small project dedicated to the preservation of Jewish music but grew into a collection of all types of music. In 2009, the RSA grew to include a Jazz collection and an early American vintage recordings collection. All of the materials in the Recorded Sound Archives have been donated by various individuals and organizations.
