= Edith Frohock =

American artist

- Born: March 10, 1917
- Died: March 15, 1997 (aged 80)
- Known for: Painting, printmaking, artist's books

Edith Frohock (1917–1997) was an American artist who lived and worked in Birmingham, Alabama. She specialized in painting, printmaking and artist's books, and was the first instructor to teach book arts in the South.

Frohock was part of the Mississippi Art Colony, where she was the featured instructor in 1984. The Smithsonian lists the colony as the country's oldest artist-run organization of its kind. Through the University of Alabama at Birmingham, friends and family endowed the Edith Frohock Scholarship. The scholarship is awarded to a Bachelor of Arts or Bachelor of Fine Arts student in junior standing with a 3.0 grade point average or higher.

== Books ==
- Dance-space: Event/installation, 1981, members of the Birmingham Museum of Art, Birmingham, Alabama ASIN: B0007379KY
- Paper works by Sharon Burg and Marji Clark, 1982, University of Alabama at Birmingham (Visual Arts Gallery) Birmingham, Alabama ASIN: B0007183Y2
- UAB Visual Arts Gallery, 1977, University of Alabama at Birmingham (Visual Arts Gallery) Birmingham, Alabama ASIN: B0007181TY
- Works by Edith Frohock, text by A. Granata, 1987, University of Alabama at Birmingham (Dept. of Art, School of Humanities) Birmingham, Alabama ASIN: B000725CXG
- UAB Faculty Exhibition: Edith Frohock, Cerise Camille, Janice Kluge, Sonja Rieger, by Dept. of Art, University of Alabama at Birmingham, (Visual Arts Gallery) Birmingham, Alabama, 1984
- Works from the Permanent Collection, 1984, University of Alabama at Birmingham (Visual Arts Gallery) Birmingham, Alabama ASIN: B0007188KG
- German Masters of Twentieth Century Art [and] Contemporary German Artists by Museum of Arts, 1976, Essays by Ellen de M. Weiland, Barita Ann Rivenbark, Edith Frohock, Charlotte Gafford and Margaret D. Sizemore Birmingham Museum of Art, Birmingham, Alabama
- American Art Directory, 1989, drawings by Edith Frohock, page 257, R.R. Bowker, American Federation of Arts
