= Jon Coffelt =

American artist (born 1963)

- Born: May 16, 1963 (age 63); Dunlap, Tennessee
- Education: Middle Tennessee State University (1981–1984); Southern Institute (1984- 1986); University of Alabama at Birmingham (1985–1986); Auburn University (1986)
- Known for: Painting, sculpture, installation art, curation

Johnny Lee Coffelt (born May 16, 1963) is an American artist who lives and works in Brooklyn, New York City. He paints, sculpts, sews, makes book arts, and curates art exhibitions.

== Background ==
Coffelt was born to Dorcas Ann (née Shadrick) and John Henry Coffelt, and has two sisters, Joanna and Janie. Coffelt was raised in the East Tennessee mountains in the town of Palmer and the community of Griffith Creek near Whitwell, Tennessee. He has been painting since he was eight years old, when his grandfather, John Ervin Coffelt taught him how. Coffelt still considers himself a colorist.

== Career ==
Coffelt's career began in the fashion industry, designing clothing as well as fabric for Willi Smith in the 1980s. Once he decided to devote his full energies to art, he was commissioned by Jim Mitchell to paint over 100 works for the Parisian department store chain.

In 1989, Coffelt received the Outstanding Ten Year Alumnus Award from Southern Institute. He was the inaugural artist at Space One Eleven founded by Anne Arrasmith and Peter Prinz, when it opened in 1989 in Birmingham, Alabama.

In 1991, Coffelt was commissioned by Absolut Vodka to kick off its "Absolut Statehood" campaign representing the state of Alabama; the result was shown in publications such as USA Today, Time, Out, and Science Digest. At 28 years old, Coffelt was the youngest artist ever commissioned by Absolut.

From 1993 until 2001, Coffelt, with former partner Shawn Boley and Janet Hughes, owned and operated Agnes, a gallery devoted to socially aware photography, short film/video and book arts.

From 1994 to 1996, Coffelt served as editor and publisher of Alabama Art Monthly. In 2002, he closed the gallery in order to move to New York and give his own art undivided attention. His work has been shown across the United States and in many overseas exhibits.

== Work ==
- In 1999, Coffelt was chosen to be part of an exhibit at the Birmingham Museum of Art called "Galore: The Continuous Painting Wall," curated by David Moos. In 2002, when Coffelt received the City of Birmingham Distinguished Artist Award in Birmingham, Alabama, Moos wrote the foreword for the published catalog.
- In 2000, Michael Pittari, editor of Art Papers, curated "Hypnotic Post: Atlanta Abstraction Now" at Swan Coach House Gallery, Coffelt was selected along with twelve other artists for "Post Hypnotic-Hypnotic Post" millennium celebration of the arts.
- In 2000, Coffelt's work was chosen for "House and Garden: Twists on Domesticity," at Space One Eleven, Birmingham, AL through a grant from the Andy Warhol Foundation for the Arts. The exhibition included the work of Karen Rich Beall also included a catalog with a foreword on Coffelt by David Moos. In this exhibition, Coffelt hand-sewed more than 250 miniature garments that were exhibited here using original fabrics from clothing surrendered by individuals across the country to produce exact replicas keeping the integrity of these pieces intact with the fabrics, shapes and seams of the garments. Coffelt calls these memory sculptures because most of the pieces came from a loved one.
- In 2002, Coffelt's work was selected to be part of "The Longest Winter", curated by Gean Moreno for Florida Atlantic University. This exhibition asks viewers to rethink notions of the domestic as the cookie-cut "normal" place it is often depicted to be. Moreno explains, "The artists in 'The Longest Winter' demonstrate that the domestic is the native ground of weird imaginations, of deranging methods and private methodologies."
- In 2007, Clayton Colvin curated "Art and Place II: Material at Hand" for Center for the Living Arts/Space 301, featuring the work of Coffelt and nine other artists. This exhibition deals with the influence that a sense of place can have on the artist. The focus lies in the significance of medium in artists' work "and how their chosen media may also function as the content or the subject.
- Fall of 2008, Coffelt's work was selected to be part of "Mend: Love Life & Loss", curated by Mark Sloan for Halsey Institute of Contemporary Art at College of Charleston School of the Arts in Charleston, South Carolina. Other artists in this exhibition included Pinky Bass and Nava Lubelski.
- For January/February 2009, Fiberarts Magazine featured Coffelt's Miniature Clothing Project in its Creative Process section. Coffelt uses cherished items of clothing to create miniature replica garments as tiny symbols of people and events, folded in time.

== Curatorial work ==
- Coffelt curated the exhibit "Contour: The Definitive Line" in 2006. The exhibit encompassed selections of drawing, painting, collage, installation, and photography, and included the work of Sara Garden Armstrong, Clayton Colvin, Lee Isaacs, and Sean Slemon.

== Books ==
- "Artistry in Fiber, Vol. 2: Sculpture" by Anne Lee, E. Ashley Rooney, foreword by Lois Russell, introduction by Adrienne Sloane 208 pp. Schiffer Books, 2017 ISBN 978-0764353420
- Absolut Statehood: 51 Painters by Glenn O'Brien, foreword by Michel Roux, photography by Antonio Alia Guccione, 116 pgs. Farrar Straus and Giroux, 1993 ISBN 0-89381-563-2
- The Art Assassin, Volume 1 by qi peng, 713 pgs. Artists Rights Society (ARS) New York Standard Copyright License, 2009
- UpSouth by bell hooks, Emma Amos and Antoinette Spanos Nordan, University Press, University of Alabama, Birmingham, 1999, pp 70–73
- New American Paintings. The Open Studios Press, Wellesley, Massachusetts, July 2001 Volume 6, Number 3 ISSN 1066-2235
- Law & Disciplinarity - Thinking Beyond Borders by Robert J Beck, 2013 pg 159 ISBN 978-1-137-03444-1
