= Nate Larson =

American artist (born 1978)

- Born: March 16, 1978
- Education: B.A., Purdue University; M.F.A., The Ohio State University
- Occupations: Artist; photographer; educator
- Employer: Maryland Institute College of Art
- Known for: Investigations of contemporary American culture and history; Geolocation (with Marni Shindelman); Centroid Towns

Nate Larson (born March 16, 1978) is a Baltimore-based artist and photographer known for investigating contemporary American culture and history.

== Education ==
Larson received a B.A. degree in Photography and Visual Communication Design in 2000 from Purdue University. He then attended The Ohio State University, receiving an M.F.A. degree in Photography in 2002. He later took additional graduate coursework at the School of the Art Institute of Chicago in Art History, Theory, & Criticism. He also took workshops in bookmaking at the Center for Book and Paper Arts at Columbia College Chicago.

== Career ==
Larson's early work dealt with evangelical American religious traditions and explored the belief systems behind religious miracles and the manner in which they were shared on the internet. His 2006 exhibition, "Charlatans and Tricksters" at Real Art Ways, consisted of a series of narrative-based quasi-documentary black-and-white photographs of the "supernormal." More accurately, they were forgeries of so-called paranormal events. Much of photography's credibility as a popular art form relies on its promise of visual truth, embodied in the axiom that the camera never lies. Seeing, you might say, is believing. But the camera does lie, and frequently, and it is from this starting point that Larson begins to craft his elaborate photographic fictions. His images, radically, work a tension between a desire to believe and the skeptical rational mind.

He has worked collaboratively with Marni Shindelman since 2007 as the collective Larson Shindelman. Their most well-known collaborative project is Geolocation, which tracks and photographs embedded coordinates in Twitter posts. The two artists see themselves as archivists and their project as a homage to the Twitter users whose posts they use. The statements are pithy — as they must be on Twitter — but often evocative, moving, even wise. Paired alongside the images, each one becomes poetic. The project includes both gallery and public art components, including a set of billboards for the 2012 Atlanta Celebrates Photography Public Art Commission. A site-specific chapter of the project was exhibited in the solo exhibition #LarsonShindelman #Mobilize at the George Eastman Museum in 2019 in Rochester, New York. Geolocation was included in the 2014 State of the Art exhibition at Crystal Bridges Museum of American Art, an exhibition survey that drew from every region of the US, offering an unusually diverse look at American art.

In 2015, Larson made portraits of Baltimore residents during the uprising in the aftermath of the death of Freddie Gray. One of his photographs from this project was used in the video #APeoplesJourney - A Nation's Story at the Smithsonian National Museum of African American History and Culture in 2017. He has continued to work in long-term community partnerships at Jubilee Arts in West Baltimore and Commodore John Rogers in East Baltimore.

Since 2014, he has worked on Centroid Towns, an anthology of stories connecting the cities that have been the mean center of the United States population. Since the first US census in 1790, the United States Census Bureau has recorded the mean center of population as it moves steadily west and south. The first recorded was near Chestertown, Maryland, and the projected centroid of the 2020 census is Hartville, Missouri. Larson has done preliminary research in all 25 towns and completed five chapters of the project with communities in Ellicott City, Maryland; Bloomington, Indiana; Mascoutah, Illinois; and De Soto, Missouri. For a 2019 solo exhibition at GRACE, Larson dove deeper into the community of Waterford, Virginia, Centroid Town of 1810. With these recent photographs, Larson has dedicated himself to a social documentary framework in which to explore a fascinating swath of America and demonstrate how exploring archives and locations allow photography to become a witness and participant in the discursive understanding of our world.

He has taught at Maryland Institute College of Art (MICA) since 2009. He was a board member of the Society for Photographic Education from 2010 to 2014 and chaired the 2014 National Conference.

== Collections ==
High Museum of Art

Portland Art Museum

Museum of Contemporary Photography

Crystal Bridges Museum of American Art

Museum of Fine Arts, Houston

Orlando Museum of Art

George Eastman Museum

Center for Photography at Woodstock

Albin O. Kuhn Library, University of Maryland Baltimore County

David M. Rubenstein Rare Book & Manuscript Library, Duke University

Contemporary Art Purchasing Program, University of Maryland, College Park

Light Work

== General sources ==
- St. Louis Public Radio
- Slate
- Places Magazine
- Schiller, Jakob (January 9, 2013). "Photos of Tweet Locations Bring 140 Characters to Life". Wired.
- The New York Times Lens Blog
- Gizmodo
- The Picture Show from NPR
- Hyperallergic
- Vice Magazine
- The Washington Post
- Indiana Public Media
- Las Vegas Sun
- Light Work
- Blue Sky Gallery
- Collect.Give
- Louisiana Tech University
- The Verge
- Genocchio, Benjamin (January 1, 2006). "When Pictures Lie, And We Gladly Believe". The New York Times.
- Museum of Contemporary Photography
- Seeing Is Believing at Gettysburg College
