= Kahn & Selesnick =

Kahn & Selesnick is a collaborative artist team made up of Nicholas Kahn and Richard Selesnick, both born in 1964. They work primarily in the fields of photography and installation art. They specialize in fictitious histories set in both the past and future.

The artists have participated in over 100 solo and group exhibitions worldwide, and have work in over 20 collections, including the Brooklyn Museum of Art, the Philadelphia Museum of Art, the Houston Museum of Fine Arts, the Los Angeles County Museum of Art, and the Smithsonian Institution. Portfolios of their work have appeared in fine art and photography magazines worldwide. They have lectured extensively at many institutions, including Brown University, the Fogg Museum at Harvard University, the Hammer Museum in Los Angeles, Princeton University, and San Francisco Art Institute.

The artists have published three books with Aperture Press: Scotlandfuturebog, City of Salt, and The Apollo Prophecies. In 2002, Scotlandfuturebog was named both the best photography book of the year by the New York Book Show, and the quirkiest photo book of the year in the Village Voice's annual top ten list. The text was written by the American author Ben Marcus.

For their 2007 project entitled Eisbergfreistadt, the artists created documentary evidence of a large iceberg turned into a fictitious city-state off of the coast of Lübeck, Germany during the great hyperinflation of 1923. An exhibition at the Overbeck-Gessellschaft Museum in Lübeck in the spring of 2010 told the story of the iceberg using a variety of media including photographs, postcards, architectural models, banknotes, period clothing, and marzipan.

Their most recently completed project, Mars: Adrift on the Hourglass Sea, debuted in Boston and is scheduled to appear in New York City, Washington D.C., Chicago, and Los Angeles.

In 2012, the artists introduced a new project, Truppe Fledermaus.
