= Béatrice Coron =

French born American artist

- Born: 1956
- Known for: Interdisciplinary artist
- Website: beatricecoron.com

Béatrice Coron (b. 1956) is a French born American interdisciplinary artist known for her public art installations, book arts, and cut paper art. Coron works in artist's books, animation, architecture, design, drawing, jewelry, sculpture, paper cutting, and public art.

== Early life and education ==
Coron attended the École nationale supérieure des beaux-arts de Lyon and the Jean Moulin University Lyon 3.

== Career ==
In 2011 Coron delivered a TED talk Stories cut from paper. In 2013 Coron and fellow story-teller James Stewart created the animated film Daily Battles. In 2020 her hand-cut installation Hi Five! Stories from the Five Boroughs was exhibited at the New-York Historical Society.

She has created pieces of public art including Roots and Wings in Washougal, Washington, and Cultivate Your Mind in the Orchard of Knowledge in San Jose, California. Her mural Dreams is in the Los Angeles Metro Rail system, and her series of screens entitled On the Right Track is in the 104 Street station of the New York MTA.

Her work is in the collection of the Metropolitan Museum of Art, the Walker Art Center, and the National Museum of Women in the Arts.

=== Works ===
Thirty-six views of the Empire State Building, artist's book, 1996
