= Maddy Rosenberg =

American artist (born 1956)

Maddy Rosenberg is an artist and curator born into a working class Jewish family in Brooklyn. She is the creator of CENTRAL BOOKING, a multidisciplinary curatorial project dedicated to artist’s books and the intersection of art and science. Her diverse artistic practice and innovative curatorial projects span multiple media, continents, and disciplines.

Rosenberg’s art practice includes oil painting, artist's books, printmaking, drawing, toy theater, installation and animation. Her work is distinctive for its attention to detail, and ability to transport the viewer to imagined worlds. She finds visual and conceptual inspiration in her fascination with architecture and cultural history. In the studio, Rosenberg says, she "removes the images from their original context and reassembles them to create a world of my own."

Rosenberg approaches curating as an extension of her creative practice and has facilitated and participated in international exchange exhibitions between New York and European artists. She spends several months each year living and working internationally, understanding the necessity of exploring new places to broaden her research and influences.

Rosenberg’s work has been exhibited in venues around the globe and are part of a number of prestigious public collections. Sandstone Steps at Kirkcudbright Galleries in Scotland is a recent collaboration with Hugh Bryden/ Roncadora Press around the Corsehill sandstone and stone carvers from Scotland used for the Million Dollar Staircase in the New York State Capitol. She was the American artist in a joint Turkish/German project sponsored by the US Consulate in Munich that included an award-winning exhibition at the end of a six-week residency and had a solo exhibition at Hudson Park Library in New York City, inaugurating their artist’s book programming. Additionally, she has participated in countless group exhibitions, including at the National Museum of Women in the Arts; The Brooklyn Museum; Philadelphia Athenaeum; Cape Cod Museum of Art; The Center for Book Arts; Flux Factory, and Kentler International Drawing Space in the U.S; Médiathèque André Malraux in Strasbourg; Eagle Gallery in London; and Herzog August Bibliothek in Wolfenbüttel.

Rosenberg has been awarded grants from the Gottlieb Foundation, and Artists Fellowship and attended residencies at Fundación Valparaiso, Guest Atelier Salzburger Künstlerhaus, Schloss Neuhaus, Blue Mountain Center and Virginia Center for the Arts.

Rosenberg received a BFA from Cornell University and her MFA from Bard College. She also has experience as an educator, teaching at Marymount Manhattan College and at the Manhattan Graphics Center for over ten years, among numerous visiting artist/curator/critic invitations over the years.

== Curatorial Career ==
Rosenberg maintains an active international curatorial as well as exhibition career. In 2009, she founded CENTRAL BOOKING, a multi-disciplinary curatorial project focusing on artist’s books and exhibitions on art & science. Originally in DUMBO, Brooklyn, it moved to Manhattan’s Lower East Side in 2013, where the expanded size and programming allowed for more ongoing collaborative partnerships. Since 2018, CENTRAL BOOKING maintains an office and viewing space in Brooklyn, as the center of simultaneous projects and has expanded its online presence.

The CENTRAL BOOKING project Plant Cure and Plant Cure-Brooklyn featured the work of Artists in Residence at the New York Academy of Medicine and Brooklyn Botanic Garden, along with exhibitions including other artists working with the theme of medicinal plants. They received grants from Creative Engagement/Lower Manhattan Cultural Council and the Brooklyn Arts Fund /Brooklyn Arts Council programs from the NYC Department of Cultural Affairs.

Redux, in 2015, was the fourth exhibition Rosenberg curated at The Center for Book Arts in New York. Her international printmaking multi-venue curatorial project, New York/Paris DIALOGUE, Paris/New York received a National Endowment for the Arts grant.

== Collections ==
- The Crouch Fine Arts Library at Baylor University has 17 artist's books of Rosenberg's, including Haunted Spaces, which includes 24 puzzle pieces in three suede bags, and Reptiles, composed of a lithographic accordion book. The Baylor Book Arts Collection began with the acquisition of Rosenberg's artist books.
- Cornell University Library's Division of Rare and Manuscript Collections has Rosenberg's work Dystopia and Shadow of Descent, both three-dimensional pop up books.
- Other public collections include Brooklyn Museum, Baltic Centre for Contemporary Art, Fogg Museum, MoMA, National Museum of Women in the Arts, Salzburg Museum, Tate Gallery, Victoria and Albert Museum, Scottish National Gallery of Modern Art, Biblioteca Nacional de España, Duchess Anna Amalia Library, Herzog August Bibliothek, New York Public Library, Staatsbibliothek zu Berlin, London College of Communications, Yale University, and many others.
