= Clayton Colvin =

American artist

- Born: 1976 (age 49–50)
- Education: New York University; University of Alabama at Birmingham; University of Alabama
- Website: claytoncolvin.com

Clayton Colvin (born 1976) is an American abstract painter, multimedia artist, collagist, curator of contemporary art, and writer who lives and works in Birmingham, Alabama.

== Education ==
Colvin received a bachelor's degree in Art History from New York University in 1999 and a master's degree in Art Education from the University of Alabama at Birmingham in 2003. He received his Master of Fine Arts degree in painting from the University of Alabama in Tuscaloosa, Alabama, in 2005.

Colvin interned for Agnes, a photography art gallery in Birmingham, Alabama, for several summers while attending university. As an undergraduate, he interned for the Jack Tilton Gallery in New York City, New York.

== Career ==
Colvin’s work has been shown in galleries across the United States, with exhibitions reviewed by Art in America and Artforum.

In 2015, Colvin received the Alabama State Council on the Arts Fellowship in Visual Arts. Since 2015, Colvin has been a faculty member at Indian Springs School, teaching art and art history while also serving as chair of the Art Department and Associate Dean of Students.

Colvin is represented by Maus Contemporary in Birmingham, Alabama.

== Exhibitions ==
=== Selected solo exhibitions ===
- 2025: CLAYTON COLVIN: THE DESCENT, Maus Contemporary, Birmingham
- 2022: CLAYTON COLVIN: BOTS AND LOOPS, Maus Contemporary, Birmingham
- 2018: Letters, etc.., The Wiregrass Museum, Dothan
- 2018: CLAYTON COLVIN: HOW MEMORY MOVES, Maus Contemporary, Birmingham
- 2015: CLAYTON COLVIN: NEW WAY TO FORGET, Maus Contemporary, Birmingham
- 2014: PULSE art fair, Beta Pictoris Gallery, Birmingham
- 2014: Launch, F18 gallery, New York City
- 2014: Put Down Your Stars, Margaret Thatcher Gallery, New York City
- 2011: CLAYTON COLVIN: SPACE MOUNTAIN, Maus Contemporary, Birmingham

=== Selected group exhibitions ===
- 2018: University of Alabama Graduate Alumni Exhibition, The Dinah Washington Cultural Arts Center, Tuscaloosa
- 2017: Uncommon Territory: Contemporary art in Alabama, Montgomery Museum of Art, Montgomery

== Public collections ==
- Mobile Museum of Art
- Birmingham Museum of Art
- High Museum of Art

== Books ==
Colvin wrote Clayton Colvin: Space Mountain, published on April 3, 2012, by Maus Contemporary. The book was published as an accompaniment to his exhibition "Space Mountain" at the Maus Contemporary gallery. It contains essays by Brian Bishop, and Brian Edmonds, as well as a poem by Ed Skoog.
