= Marie Weaver =

American artist

- Education: University of Vermont; Syracuse University
- Style: Ceramics; Book arts Printmaking; Graphic design
- Spouse: Stephen Harvey
- Website: marieweaver.com

Marie Weaver is an American artist who specializes in ceramic sculpture, printmaking, book arts, and graphic design. Weaver lives and works in Gwynedd, Pennsylvania. A former professor, Weaver retired from teaching and began a practice in fine art in 2003. Honored by The University of Alabama at Birmingham, the Marie Weaver and Steve Harvey Endowed Scholarship Fund for Graphic Design was created in 2003 by the University of Alabama at Birmingham in honor of associate professor of graphic design Marie Weaver and her husband, professor of biochemistry and molecular genetics Stephen C. Harvey, Ph.D. for their strong support of the arts at University of Alabama at Birmingham.

== Education ==
- Ursuline Academy, Wilmington, Delaware, 1970
- University of Vermont B.A. 1976
- Syracuse University M.F.A 1989

== Work ==
- Sabra Field Printmaking apprentice, 1976-77
- The University of Alabama at Birmingham graphic designer, 1978-81
- The University of Alabama at Birmingham, chief of graphic arts, 1981-85
- The University of Alabama at Birmingham, professor, 1990-2002

== Quotes ==
- "Moments of change inform my work. The change could be something as subtle as the exchange of a glance, a fleeting shadow or a sudden realization....In creating compositions that reflect moments of change, I frequently use birds as metaphor—for transitions, as models of adaptability, as harbingers of danger, as symbols of the spirit. -Marie Weaver

== Books and Catalogs ==
- '“500 Figures in Clay, Volume 2”', Lark Crafts/Sterling Publishing Co, Inc., Asheville, NC, 2014 (Juror: Nan Smith),p29
- '“500 Handmade Books, Volume 2”', Lark Crafts/Sterling Publishing Co, Inc., Asheville, NC, 2013 (Juror: Julie Chen), p73
- '"White Graphics: The Power of White in Graphic Design”' by Gail Deibler Finke, Rockport Publishers, Inc, 2001, p103
- ‘“Creative Edge Brochures”’, Gail Deibler Finke, North Light Books, Cincinnati, 2000, p68
- ‘“Great Design Using Non-Traditional Materials”’, Shere Clark, Wendy Lyons, North Light Books, 1996, p91
- "UpSouth" by bell hooks, Emma Amos and Antoinette Spanos Nordan, University Press, University of Alabama, Birmingham, 1999, pp 70–73
- "The World's Women On-Line! Women and Information Technology: An Electronic Art Networking Event" (In conjunction with the United Nations' Fourth World Conference on Women: Action for Equality, Development, and Peace; Beijing, China, 30 August-15 September 1995. Pilot Internet Event at Arizona State University's Computing Commons Gallery, March; subsequent CD-ROM)
