= Lee Isaacs =

American photographer

- Occupation: Photographer

Lee Isaacs is an American photographer, living and working in Birmingham, Alabama.

Isaacs studied pinhole photography with Pinky Bass. He has worked both with commercial and art photography. He works with photography seminars and teaches classes and workshops across the US.

He has involved himself with many different aspects of photography and photography over the last twenty years. He incorporates processes including digital, polaroid, polaroid transfer, pinhole photography, digital as well as color photography of all sorts and gelatin silver.

James Nelson, said, "Using the human torso as a point of departure, Lee Isaacs' digital photographs turn undulating flesh and bone into sand dunes that become beautiful landscapes."

As an active member of the Photography Guild of the Birmingham Museum of Art, Isaacs helps provide support to the museum's photography collection through programming and fund-raising. Through this guild, Isaacs recently participated in the "Pinhole Camera" exhibit at Whatley Drake along with Sylvia Martin, Sonja Rieger and Wayne Sides.

== Media ==
- "UpSouth," Essays by bell hooks, Emma Amos and Antoinette Spanos Nordan. Poetry by Priscilla Hancock Cooper. [Traveling exhibition.], 76 pp., color illus. 4to (10 x 8 in.), wraps. 1999 University of Alabama Press.
- As the photography editor, Isaacs contributed photowork to over 20 editions of the Alabama Art Monthly published by Agnes as the first statewide art magazine with photospreads, portraits and tableaux work.
- Isaacs was the still photographer for the film Johnny Flynton.
