= Jeff Wassmann =

American artist, writer and theorist (born 1958)

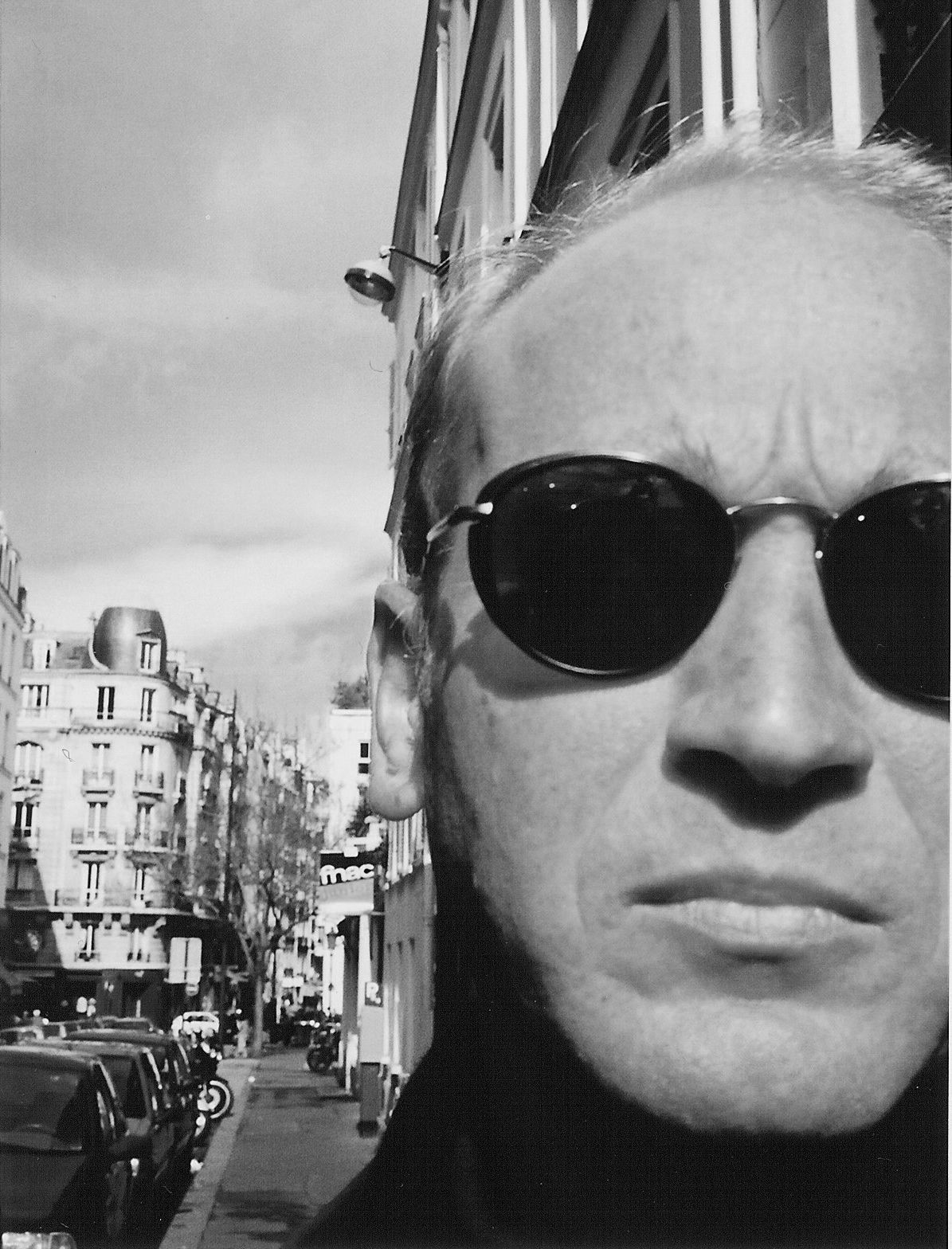
- Wassmann in Paris, 2006.
- Born: April 2, 1958 (age 68); Mars, Pennsylvania
- Education: Northwestern University
- Known for: assemblage, photography, new media, culture jamming
- Movement: Dada, Surrealism, Superfiction

Jeff Wassmann (born April 2, 1958) is an American artist, writer and theorist, currently living in Melbourne, Australia. His first novel, The Buzzard, was released in October 2012. Wassmann's art work incorporates assemblage, photography, web-based new media and aspects of culture jamming.

== Early life ==
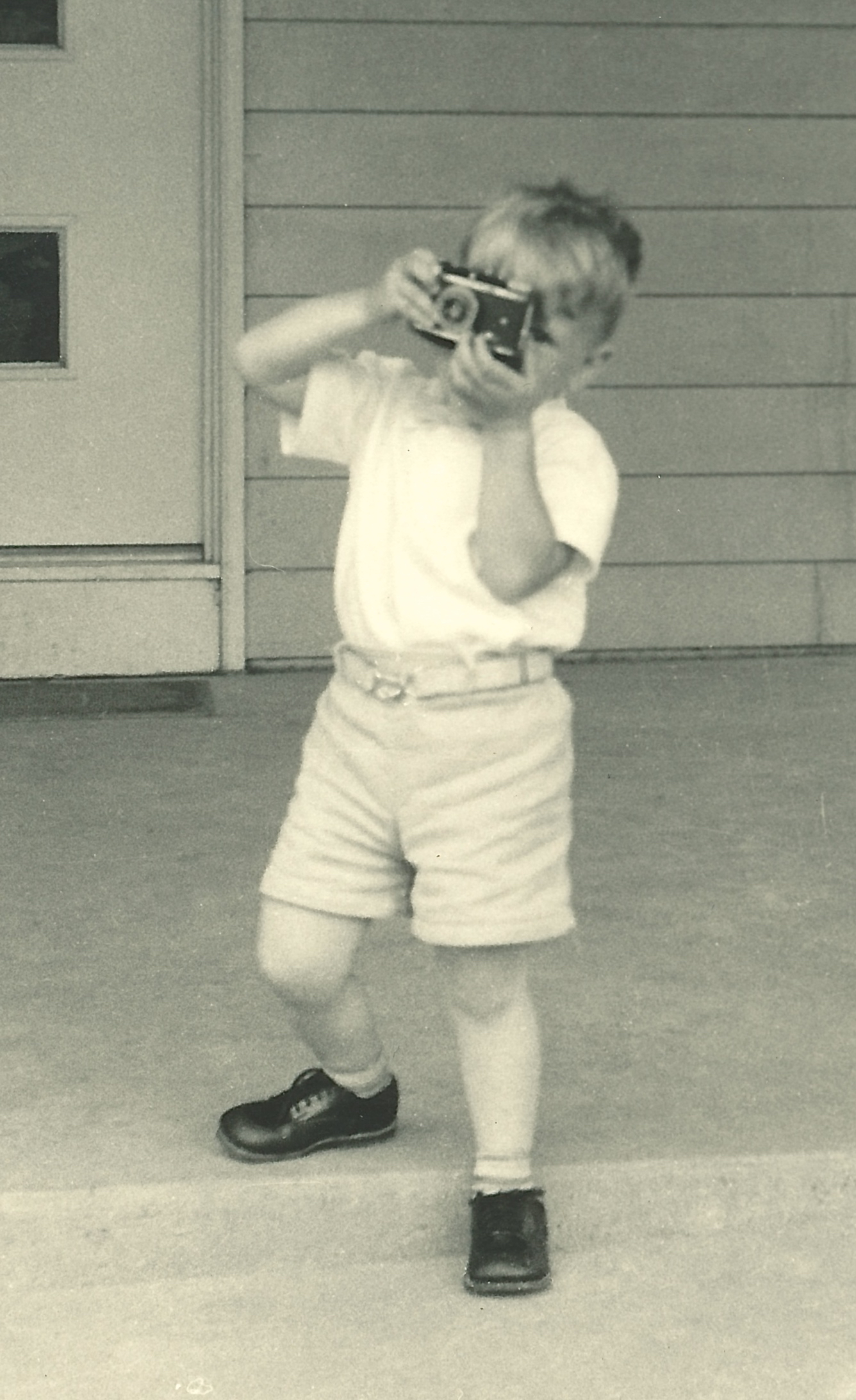
Jeff Wassmann, Mars, Pennsylvania, circa 1961.

Wassmann was born in Mars, Pennsylvania, the youngest of four children. His father was an engineer and worked in the steel industry. His mother trained as a chemist and research librarian, later worked as a school librarian and was active in local politics. He grew up in a family with a strong feminist legacy; his paternal grandmother ran the office of Pennsylvania Governor Gifford Pinchot; his maternal grandmother taught at the American University of Beirut Hospital.

At the age of seven Wassmann contracted rheumatic fever, was hospitalised and left with a heart murmur. Two years later, his older brother (one of three siblings) developed juvenile rheumatoid arthritis, leaving him unable to walk unassisted for the next several years. During these periods of confinement, the two acquired early mutual interests in photography, art and architecture that would define their work in later years. His brother would become a well-known acoustical architect in New England. He travelled to Timaru, New Zealand in 1975 as an exchange student, where he attended Timaru Boys' High School; he graduated from North Allegheny High School in Wexford, Pennsylvania the following year.

== Education ==
Wassmann studied postcolonial theory in the 1970s with Edward Said's mentor, friend and colleague, Ibrahim Abu-Lughod, at Northwestern University's Institute for African Studies in Chicago, where he majored in political science and international studies. As a part of his course-work at Northwestern, Wassmann studied painting with Ed Paschke and his then assistant Jeff Koons. He later studied parliamentary politics in Wellington, New Zealand as a Richter Scholar before returning to Chicago, where he worked variously as an artist, writer and photojournalist.

== Photography ==
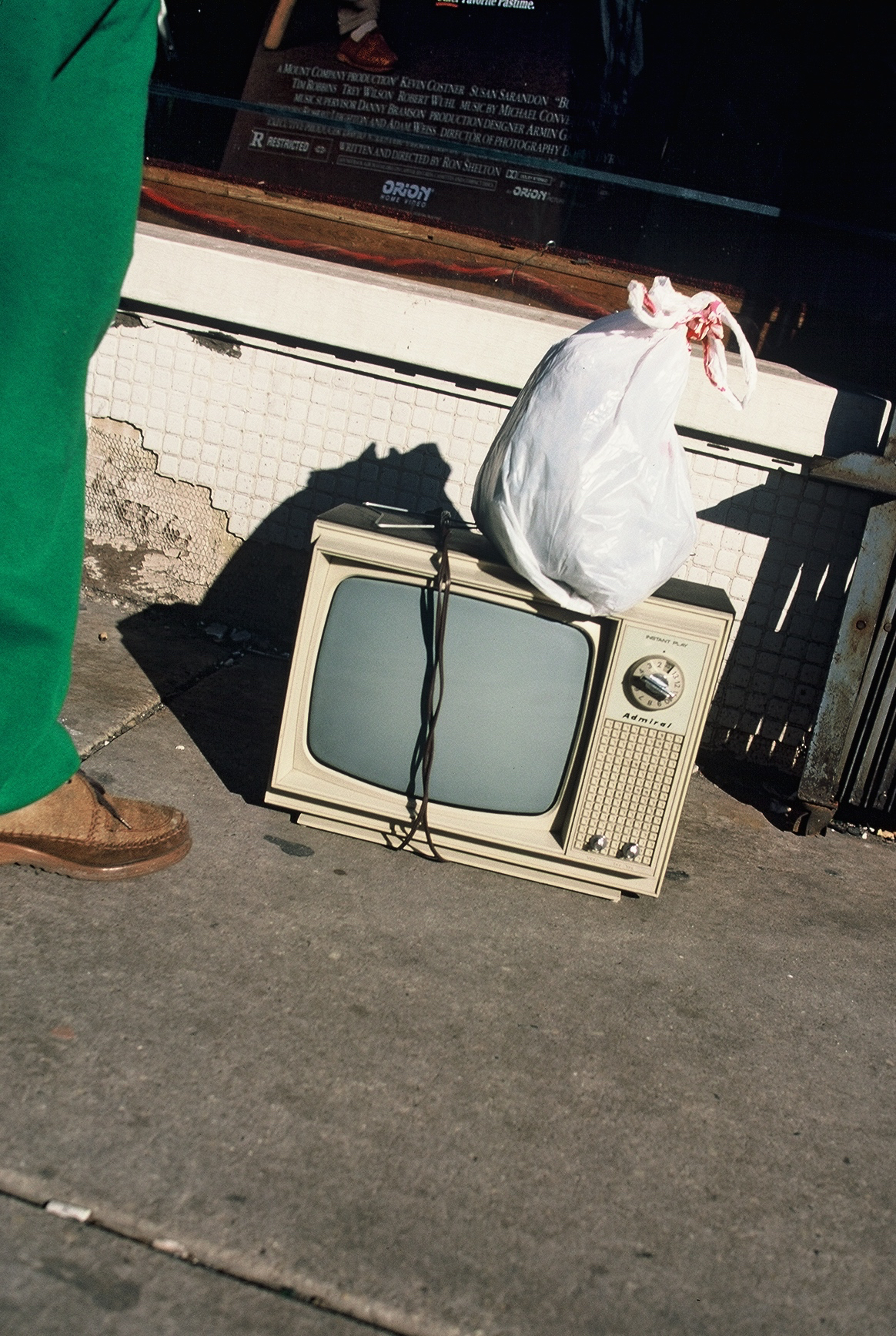
"Chicago in the Reagan Era," Maxwell Street, January 1989. Collection of the artist.

Several events in 1980 would influence Wassmann's decision to sideline a long-planned career in the diplomatic corps, embarking instead on photojournalism. The most seminal was a visit to the exhibition Henri Cartier-Bresson: Photographer at the Art Institute of Chicago early in the year, a show that would have a profound impact on his vision as a photographer. Soon after, while still a student at Northwestern, Wassmann answered the phone at the Daily Northwestern, where he was photo editor, to find Ted Kennedy's campaign manager on the line, asking him to join the Senator's presidential campaign in Illinois as official photographer. Kennedy lost, and in November Ronald Reagan won the general election against incumbent Jimmy Carter, discouraging Wassmann further from his State Department aspirations. As the year closed Wassmann was awarded the Grand Prix in Ilford's inaugural International Cibachrome Awards, finalizing his move into photography.

In the coming years Wassmann would discover the black and white photography of Robert Frank, Diane Arbus, Garry Winogrand and Lee Friedlander, while coming under the increasing influence of the color imagery of William Eggleston, Joel Meyerowitz, Stephen Shore and Susan Meiselas.

During this period Wassmann's photography appeared in publications including The New York Times, The Christian Science Monitor, The Economist, Fortune and The Times (London). In 1984 his work took the notice of Philip Jones Griffiths, the Welsh photographer and then president of Magnum Photos, who put forward Wassmann's portfolio for nomination to the esteemed French photo agency. No photographers were accepted for membership to Magnum in that year, but it was on the encouragement of Jones Griffiths that Wassmann began actively writing articles to accompany his photographs, later attending the Iowa Summer Writing Festival. For a short time he shared a weekly page of street fashion in Women's Wear Daily with the New York photographer Bill Cunningham. Cunningham took offense to the way WWD editors often portrayed the women he photographed, however, so he moved permanently to the New York Times and began his popular column.

In the closing years of the decade Wassmann dedicated himself to street photography, shooting over 10,000 unpublished Kodachrome slides in a body of work the artist titles Chicago in the Reagan Era. In March 1989, he emigrated to Australia.

== The influence of Joseph Cornell ==
Wassmann first encountered the boxed assemblage and collage works of Joseph Cornell (1903–1972) at the Art Institute of Chicago in the mid-1970s, not long after the artist's death in 1972. Perhaps with the confidence of youth Wassmann once told an interviewer, "It was the only work I didn't get back then." The large Bergman collection of Cornell boxes must have been just as bewildering to the museum's curators, as it was then oddly housed alone in a small room on the ground floor between Greek antiquities and Mayan artifacts. Only many years later would the collection be moved upstairs and woven into the narrative of 20th century modern art.

The strong structural and thematic similarities between the work of Jeff Wassmann and Joseph Cornell are often noted and readily apparent. This is by no means coincidental and their origins are more than cursory.

Like Cornell, Wassmann came from an "old Methodist family." Cornell's parents were both from socially prominent New York families of Dutch ancestry, while Wassmann's mother, a Furber, could trace her lineage back to the Revolutionary War's General Richard Furber, and beyond that to William Furber's arrival in the New World from Devonshire on one of Sir Walter Raleigh's ships on August 14, 1635.

The art critic Robert Hughes attributes much of Cornell's artistic sensibility to his East Coast moorings. In The Shock of the New he writes, "Cornell would admit nothing to his memory theatre that was not, in some degree, elegant. This may sound a recipe for preciosity, but it was not, because Cornell had a rigorous sense of form, strict and spare, like good New England cabinetwork." Wassmann grew up influenced not only by his deep family roots, but more immediately by a Pennsylvania Dutch community in nearby Butler County, which only heightened his aesthetic for the spartan design and precise, but elegant, carpentry he saw in his Amish neighbors. He would go on to spend several years studying with the German cabinetmaker Ernst Zacher and would not undertake his first boxed work until he had reached the maturity of his early forties.

While Cornell fed his interest in nineteenth century books, ephemera and popular engravings by fossicking the shops and markets of Lower Manhattan in the 1920s, eighty years on, Wassmann extended his search to the shops and markets of France, Germany, Belgium, the U.S., Mexico and Australia to keep a stock of similar material.

The most intriguing aspect of this artistic resonance, however, can be found at a more curious intersection of their two lives, namely, the Christian Science church. Wassmann's grandmother Furber (née Fredericks) gained an interest in Christian Science after her return to New York from Beirut in the mid-1920s. Eight years Cornell's senior, she began attending a Christian Science church on Long Island in the same years as Cornell. The young artist had been drawn to the church by a coworker in hopes of finding a cure for his brother, Robert, who suffered from cerebral palsy, but he became equally fascinated by the transcendental nature of Mary Baker Eddy's teachings. He would remain devoted to Christian Science throughout his life. While Wassmann's parents both returned to the Methodist church, Christian Science continued as an influence on his upbringing and throughout his twenties when Wassmann worked as a photographer covering the Midwest for the Christian Science Monitor.

Robert Hughes makes the point that the sheer peculiarity of Cornell would not easily attract a wide school of followers for the artist. "Until his death in 1972, Joseph Cornell was the most reclusive, subtle and figurative of American artists; his work was so idiosyncratic that it made nonsense of its imitators, so there could be no école de Cornell." Well aware of this paradox, Wassmann went on to contemplate not what might come after Joseph Cornell, but rather, what might have come before him. Thus was born his artistic conceit: the early German modernist Johann Dieter Wassmann (1841–1898).

== Assemblage boxes ==
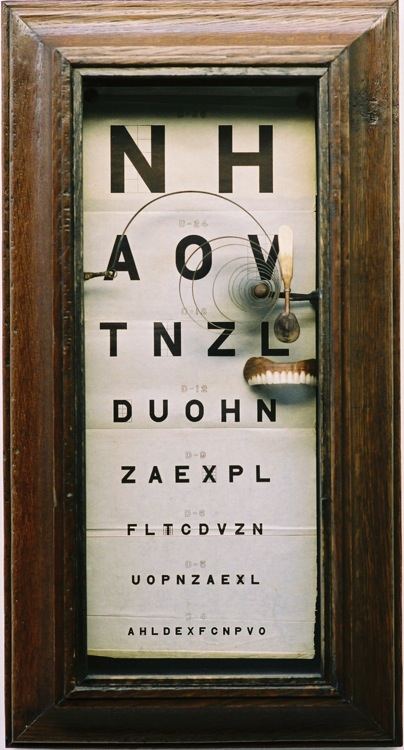
Johann Dieter Wassmann (Jeff Wassmann), Vorwärts! (Go Forward!), 1897.

In his art and writings, Wassmann expresses fascination with Leibniz's reductionism and his paradigm of the non-linearity of time, applied to both contemporary culture and recent antecedents in the history of Modern art.

As a visual artist, Wassmann continues to work under the nom de plume of the pioneering German modernist Johann Dieter Wassmann (1841–1898). He is the creator of two equally fictitious institutions, The Wassmann Foundation, Washington, D.C. and MuseumZeitraum Leipzig. Wassmann's art practice received worldwide exposure after a solo exhibition of his work, titled Bleeding Napoleon, was included in curator Juliana Engberg's visual arts program for the Melbourne International Arts Festival 2003. Through the character of Johann Dieter Wassmann, the artist explores his transcendental vision of the lost opportunity of inseparable time and space as he imagines it might have been optimistically perceived in the hours before the dawn of the catastrophic twentieth century. In creating the character of Johann Dieter Wassmann and bestowing on him all the art world accoutrements a dead artist needs – the well-endowed American foundation, the cadre of curators, the Flash-driven website and the European roots – the contemporary artist has been quietly, and with some success, 'placing' the dead artist into the Western canon.

This co-existence of artist and character nearly two centuries apart, experiencing similar realities, the artist sees not as a hoax, but as illustration of his view of the non-linearity of time and more particularly a defiance of the rigidly linear perspective of art criticism. Here Wassmann draws heavily on the work of the German mathematician Hermann Minkowski (1864–1909) and his oft-quoted passage:

The views of space and time which I wish to lay before you have sprung from the soil of experimental physics, and therein lies their strength. They are radical. Henceforth space by itself, and time by itself, are doomed to fade away into mere shadows, and only a kind of union of the two will preserve an independent reality.

In doing so, Wassmann raises questions about our prescribed notion of progress, concurrent with the views of the conceptual artist Tino Sehgal. In an unusual move for a contemporary artist, Wassmann does not sell his work; some pieces are given away as gifts, while most have been retained as part of a broader private collection of 18th and 19th century antiques and ephemera that are only infrequently exhibited as the estate of the character (see #Gallery section below). Like Joseph Cornell and Vivian Maier before him, Wassmann has produced a prolific volume of work that is rarely seen.

The project is the subject of a film that remains in development under the working title, The Foundation, with funding provided by Film Victoria. Producer: Richard Moore. In Australia, Wassmann's work is sometimes associated with an art movement known as superfiction. In 2004, Art in America's Washington, D.C. correspondent, James Mahoney, wrote,

Such visionaries as Herr Wassmann will not only endure, they will prevail, I'm more than certain.

== Further projects ==
Wassmann continues to publish as a writer and photojournalist. In 2004 he was awarded a Creative Fellowship by the State Library of Victoria. In 2006 Wassmann was honoured as a Governor of the National Gallery of Victoria. He served as a board member of the Australian Art Orchestra from 2006 to 2009. He is also founding director of Bleeding Napoleon Pty Ltd, a not-for-profit arts charity funding performance and installation works. In this role, he has co-produced two works by the playwright Brian Lipson: Bergasse 19, for the Melbourne International Arts Festival 2005 and A Large Attendance In The Antechamber, which saw a three-week run at the Sydney Opera House in July 2006.

In recent years he has collaborated with jazz pianist and Adelaide Festival director Paul Grabowsky in the making of several albums, including Tales of Time and Space (Warner/Chappell), recorded in New York with Branford Marsalis and Joe Lovano; the ARIA Music Awards-winning Before Time Could Change Us (Warner/Chappell) with Katie Noonan, libretto by Dorothy Porter and Ruby (AAO), with Ruby Hunter and Archie Roach.

In April 2008 Wassmann was diagnosed with chronic heart failure. On June 2, 2008 he underwent open-heart surgery at Melbourne's Epworth Hospital for repair of the mitral valve. The surgery was successful, allowing Wassmann to return to the studio later in the year, although he remains reclusive. Wassmann suffers from Fuchs' dystrophy, a genetic disorder with the degenerative loss of corneal cells, leading to corneal edema and severe loss of sight. While there is no cure for Fuchs' dystrophy, corneal transplant procedures are generally successful at restoration of sight.

Wassmann is married, with three children. In June 2011 his wife, Melinda Geertz, was a co-recipient of a Golden Lion and the Grand Pris award at the Cannes Lions International Festival of Creativity for her work on disability awareness. In December 2024 she was appointed chairman of the Make-A-Wish Foundation Australia.

== Gallery ==
=== Chicago in the Reagan Era ===
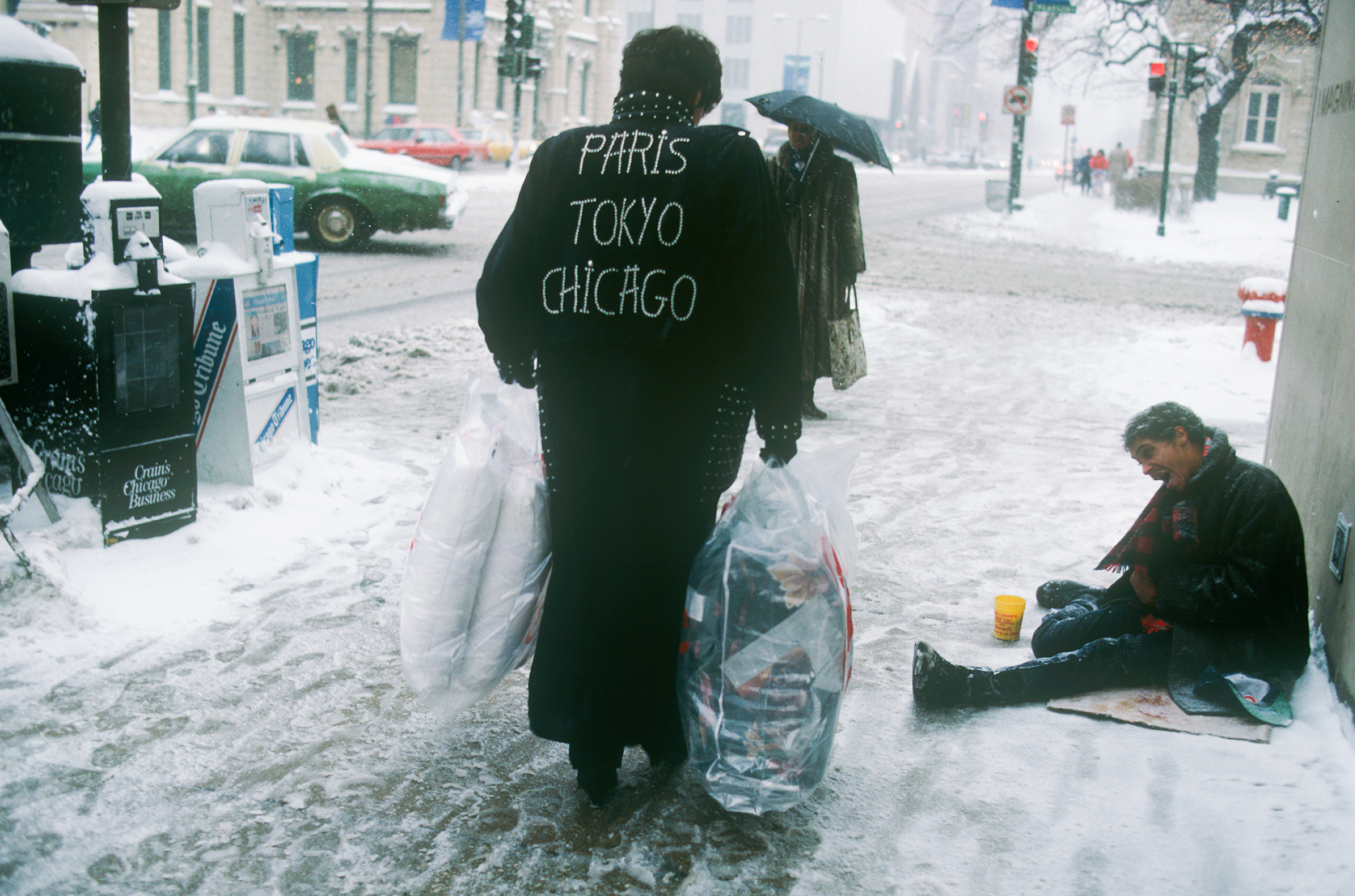
North Michigan and East Pearson, February 1989.

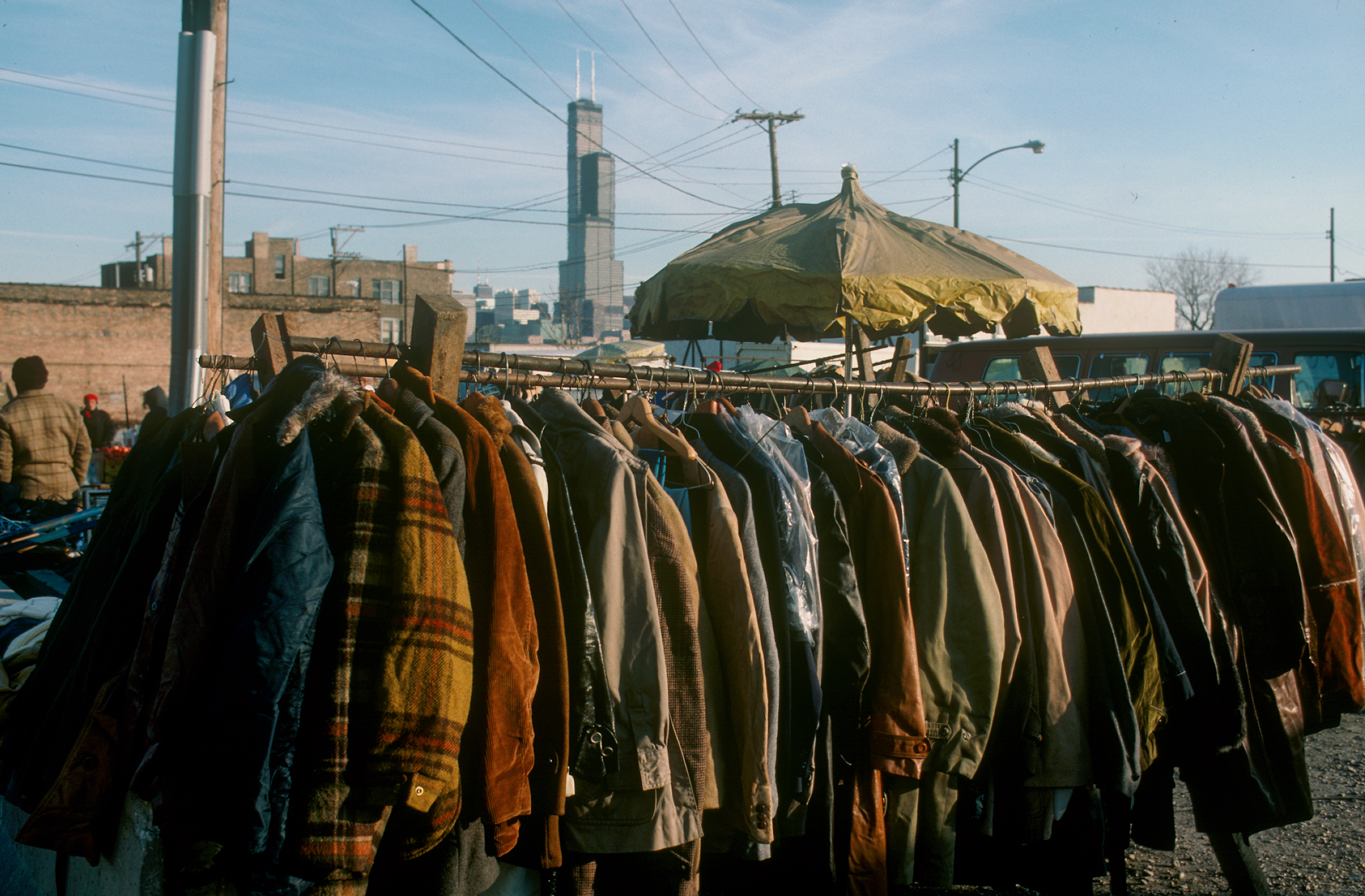
Maxwell Street, November 1987.

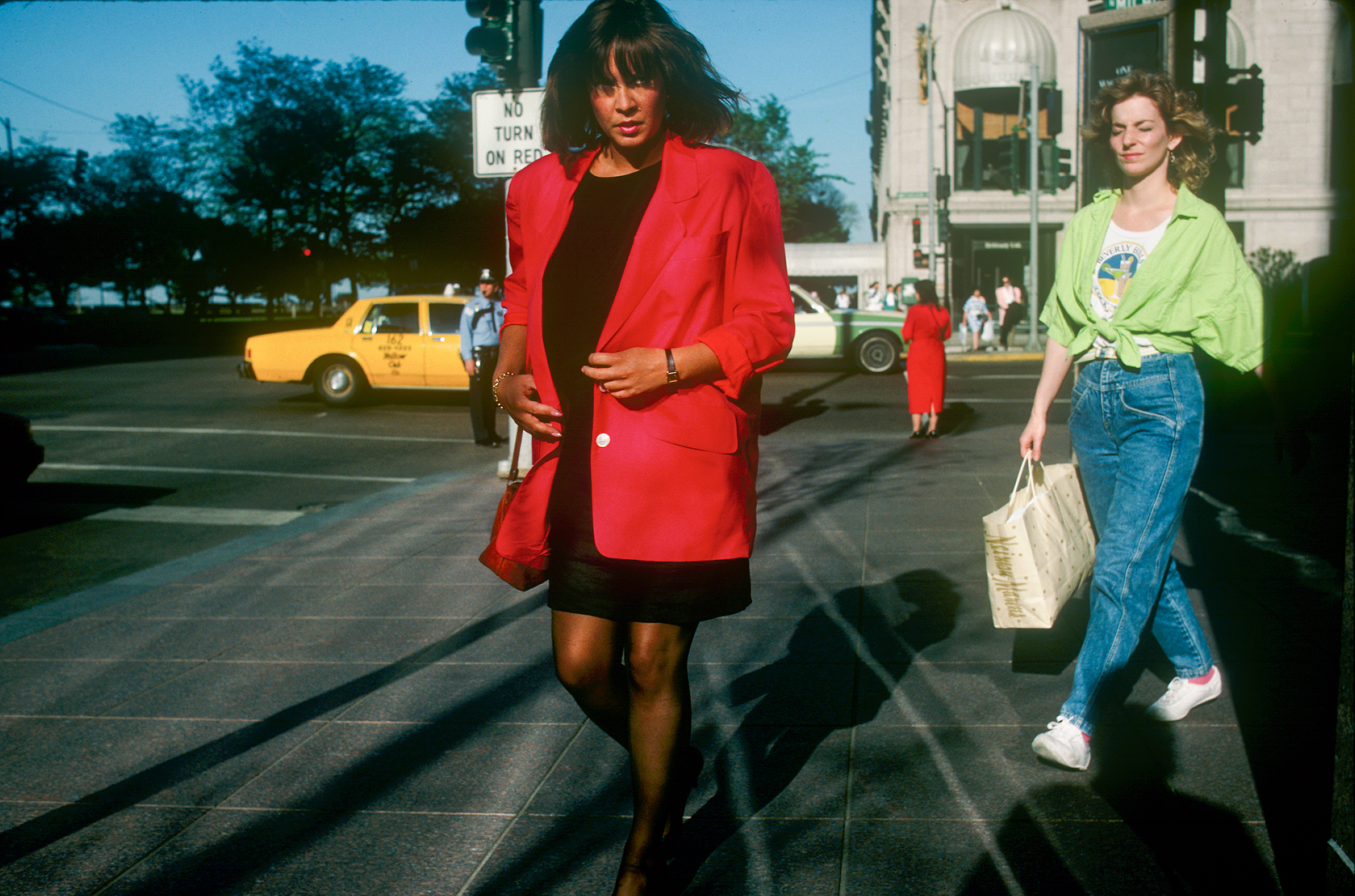
East Oak Street and North Michigan Avenue, June 1988.

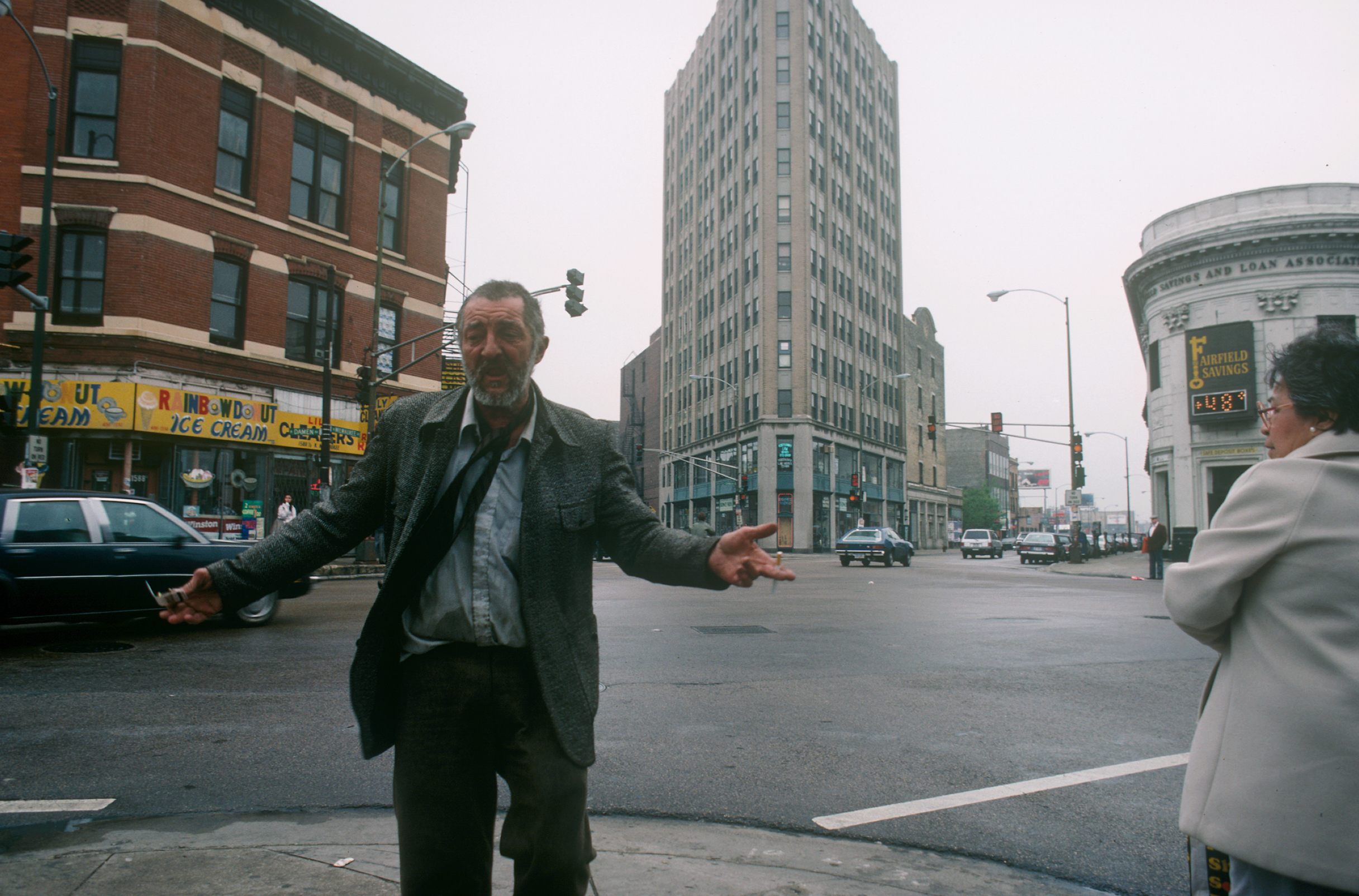
Milwaukee, North and Damen, May 1988.

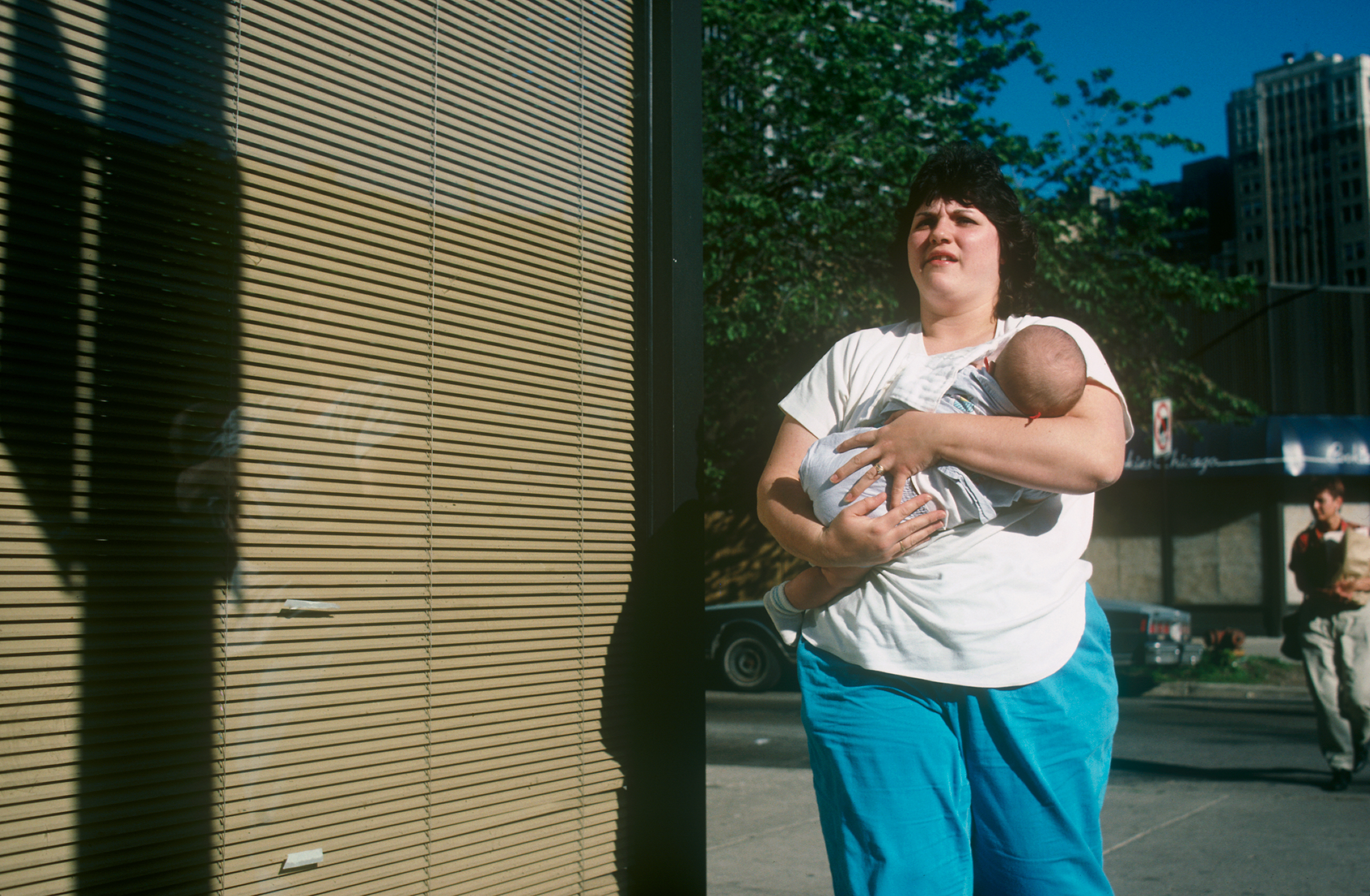
North State Street, May 1988.

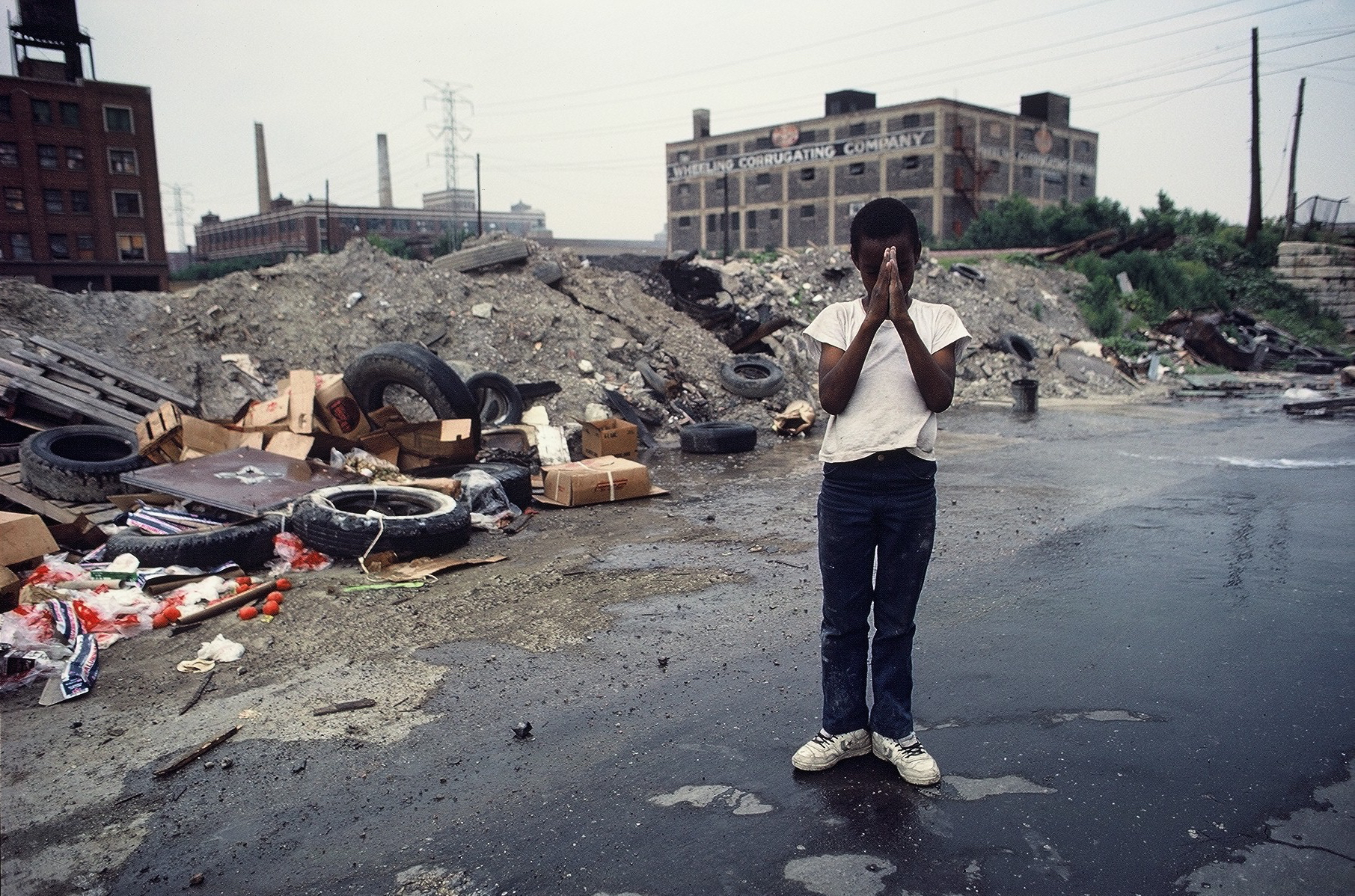
Taylor near Washtenaw, June 1987.

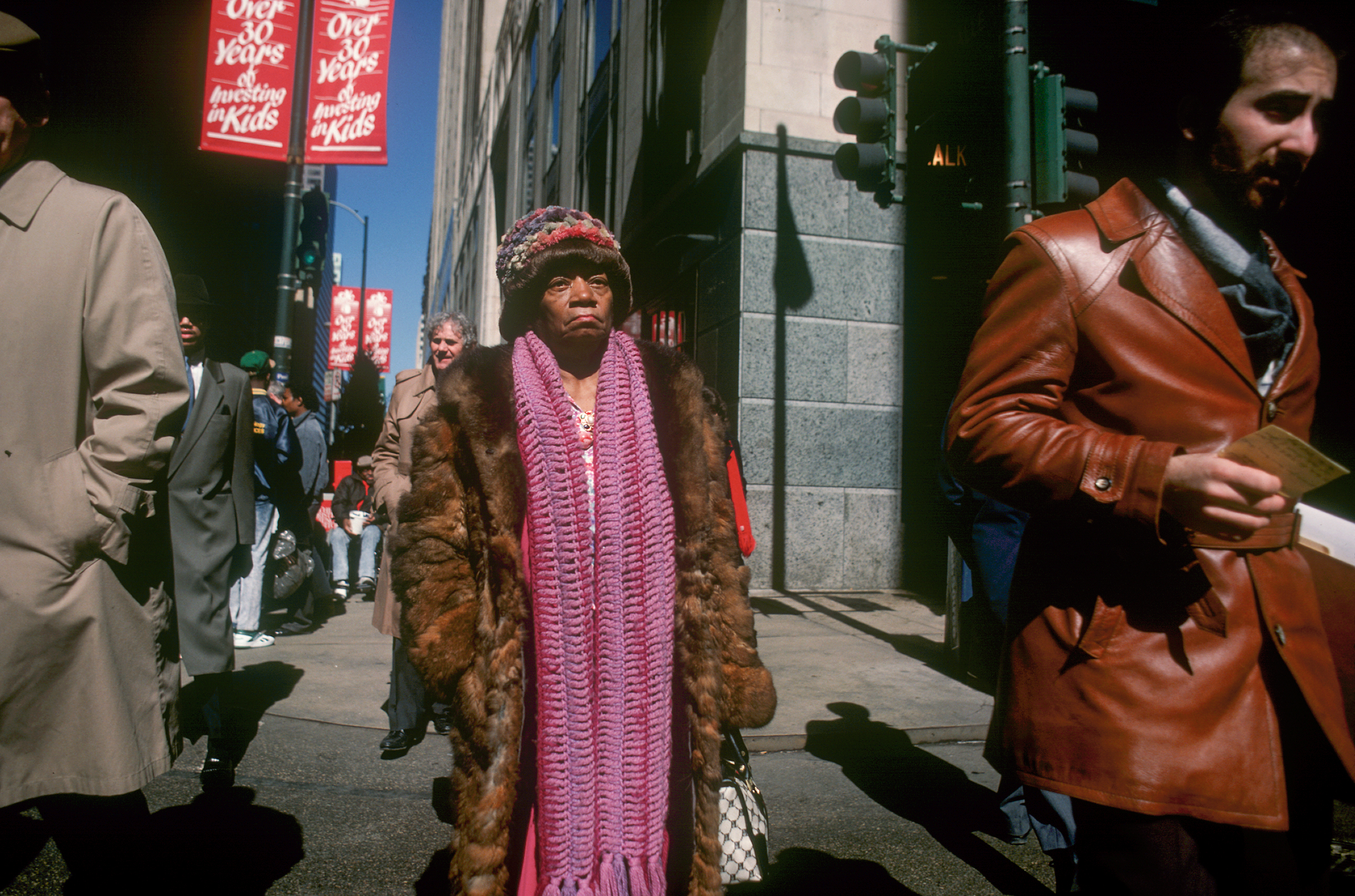
South LaSalle Street, March 1988.

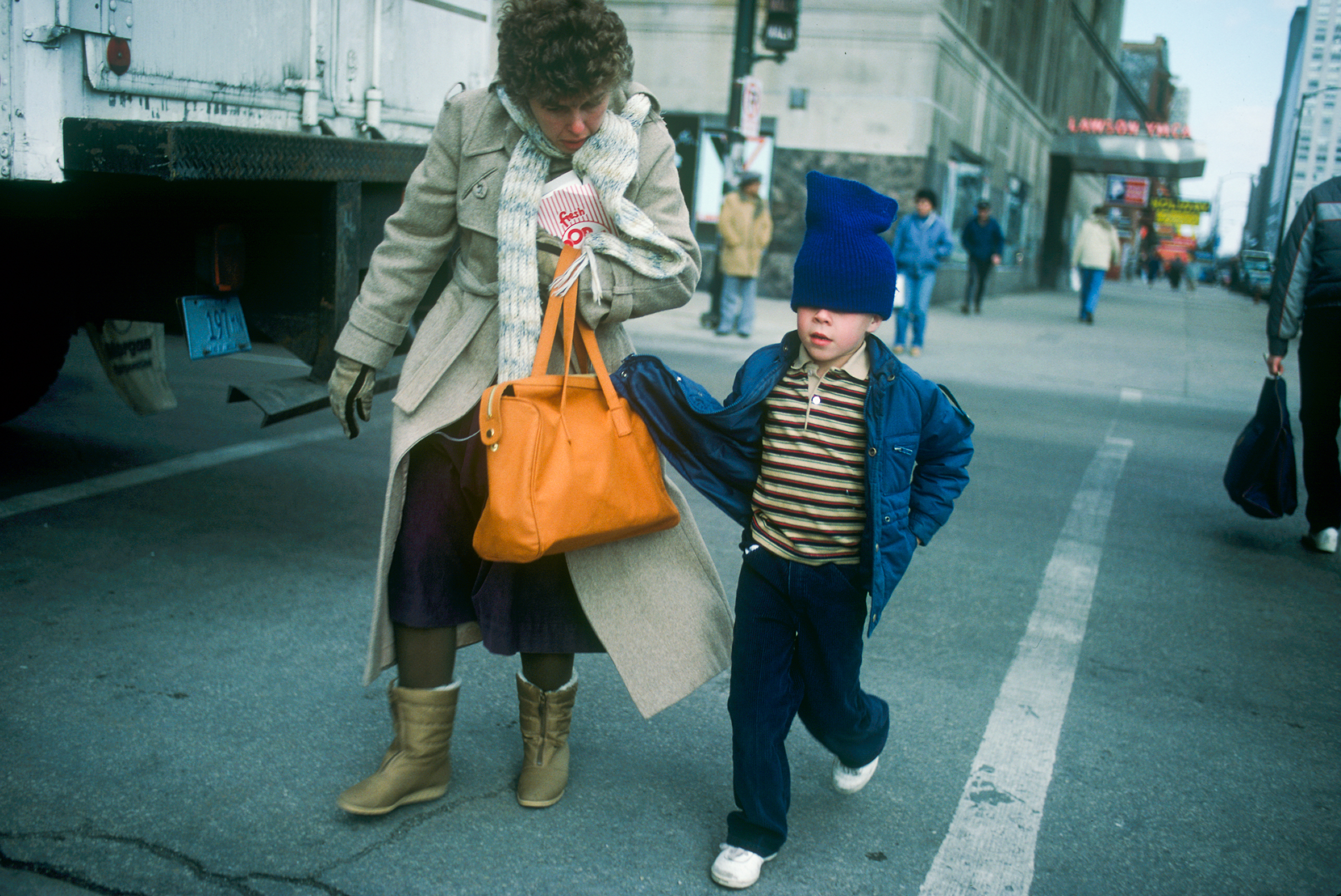
West Chicago Avenue, March 1988.

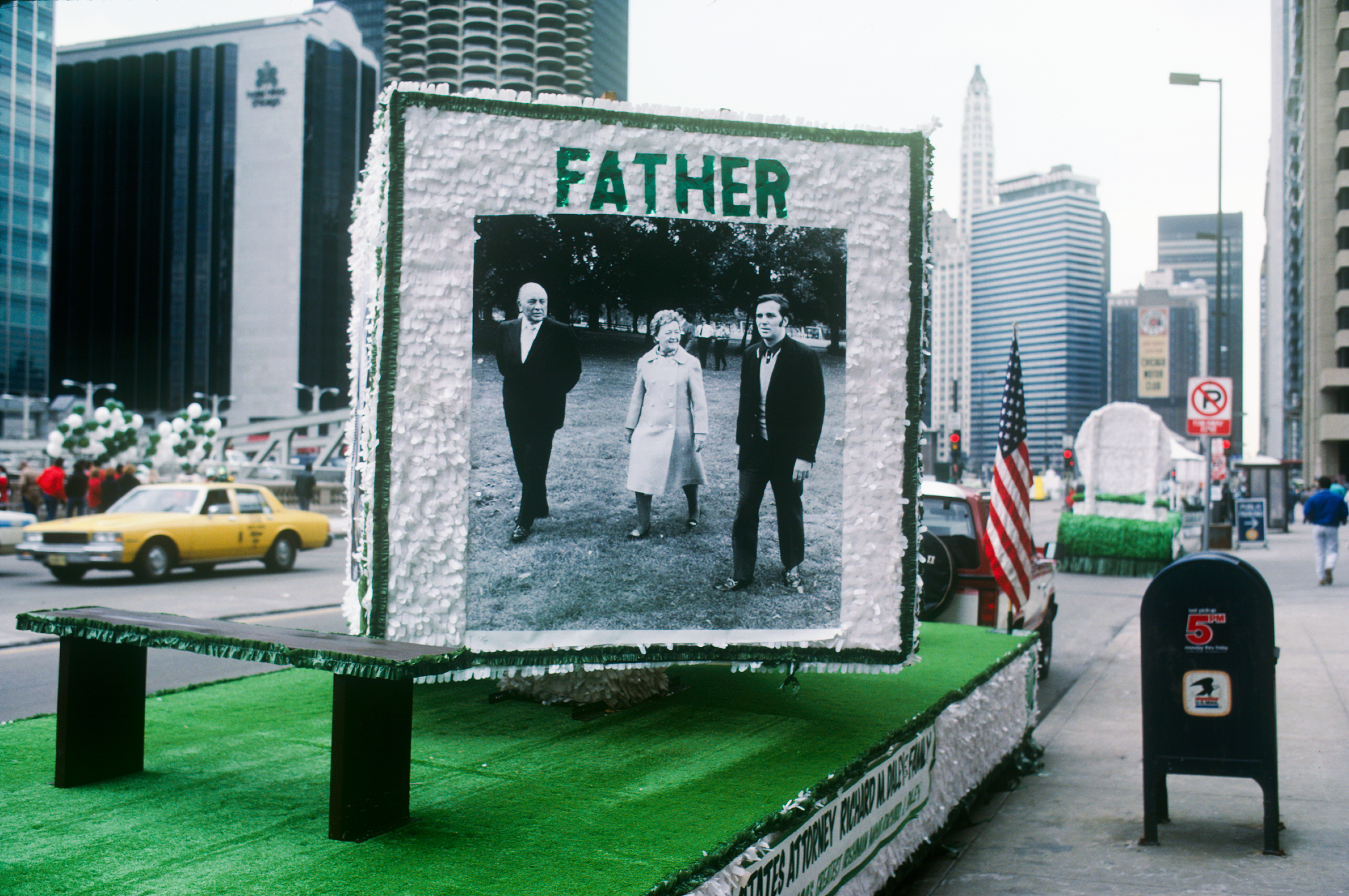
West Wacker Drive, March 1988.

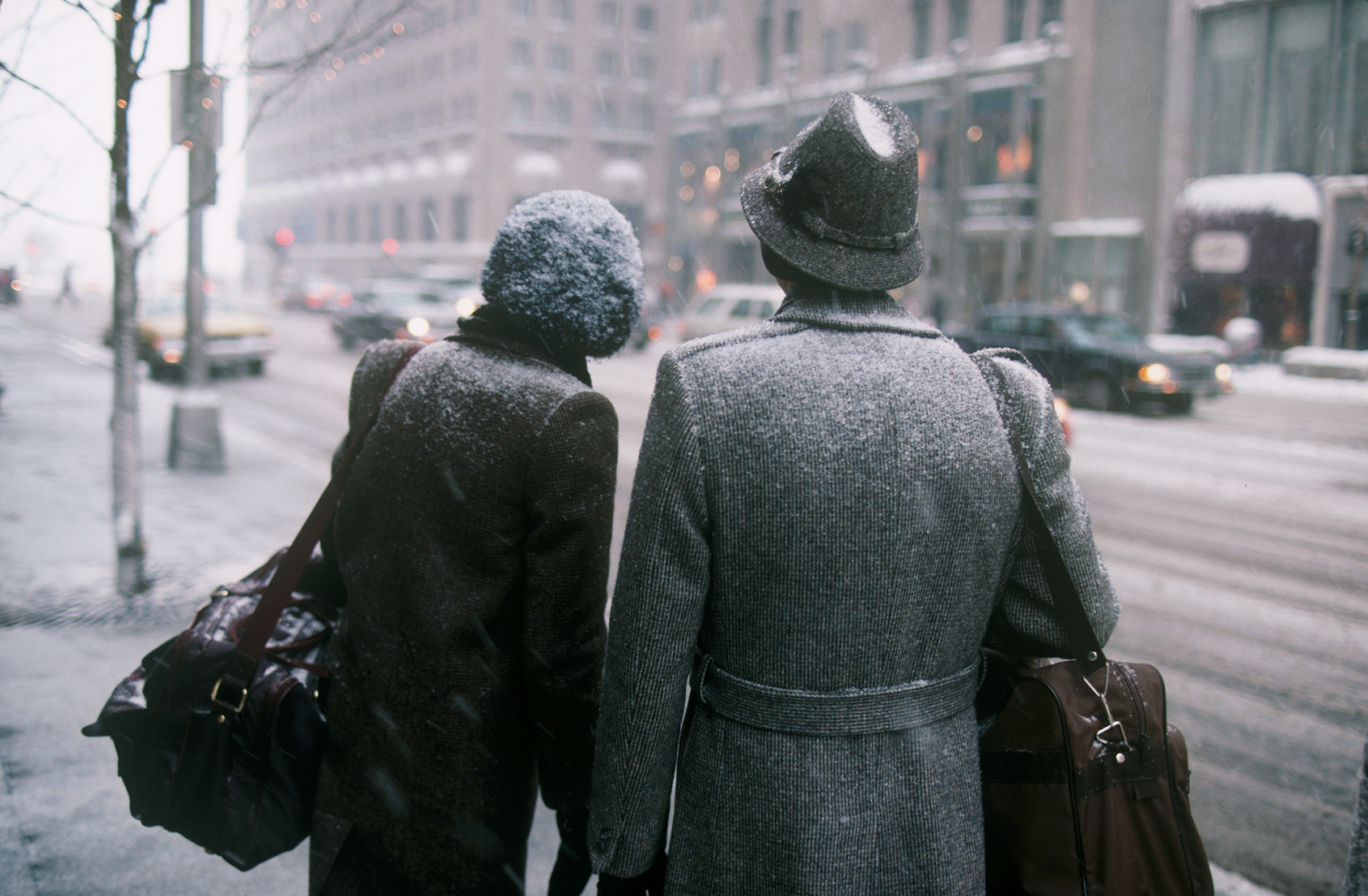
North Michigan Avenue, February 1989.

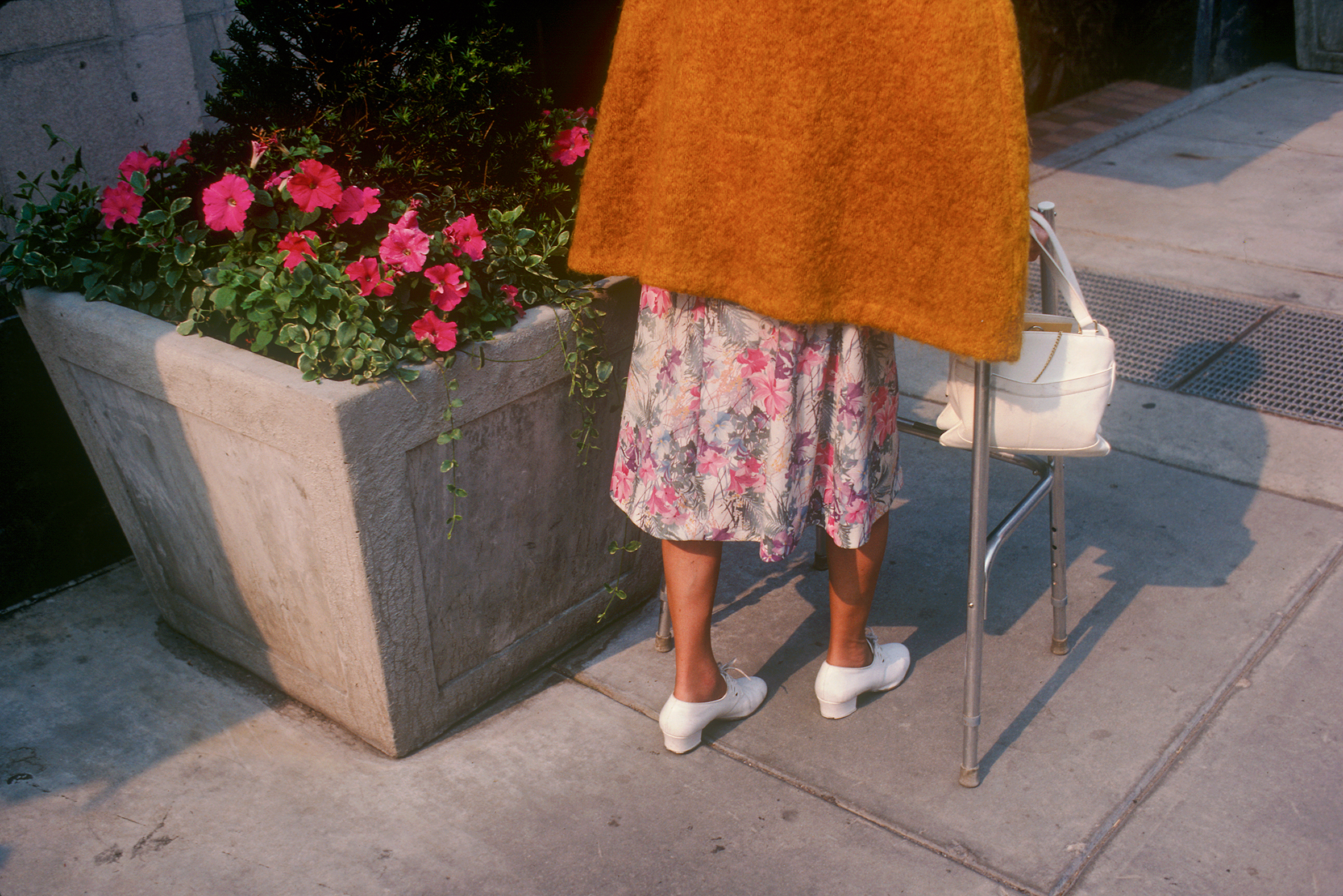
East Ohio Street, July 1985.

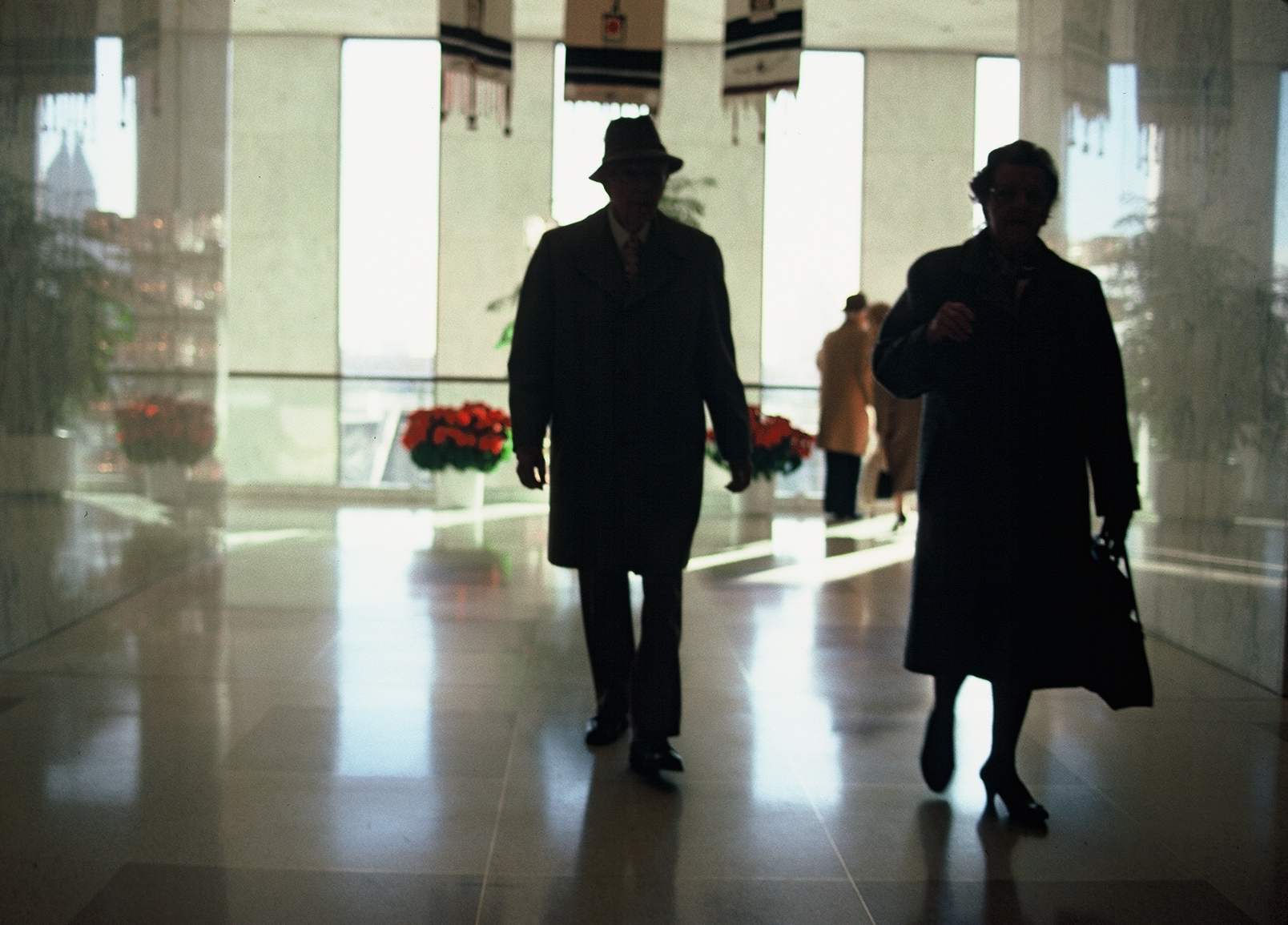
Standard Oil lobby, December 1988.

=== Assemblage boxes ===
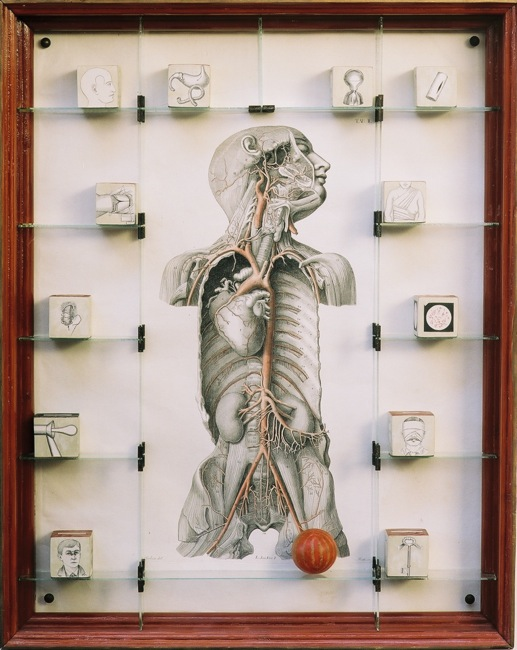
Arteriae Pelvis, Abdomimis, et Pectoris, 1883. 70 x 55.5 x 8 cm. MuseumZeitraum Leipzig.

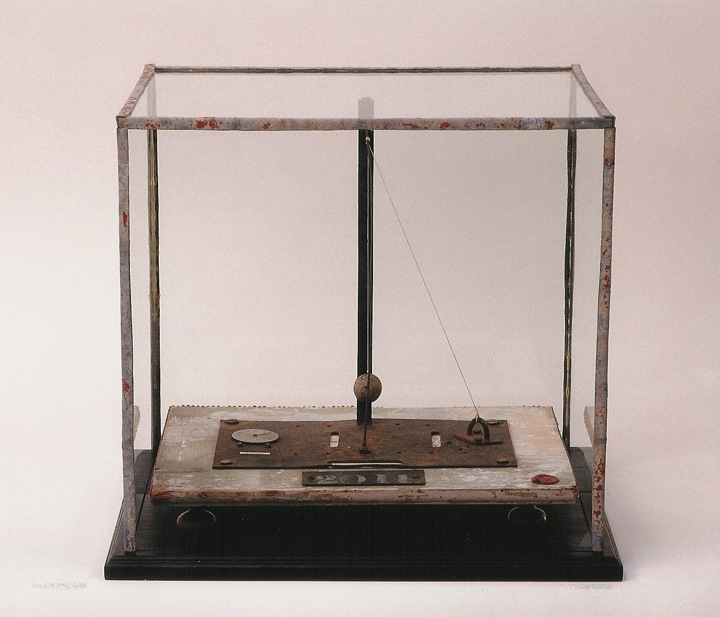
Foucault's Pendulum, 1884. 36 x 18.5 x 9 cm. MuseumZeitraum Leipzig.

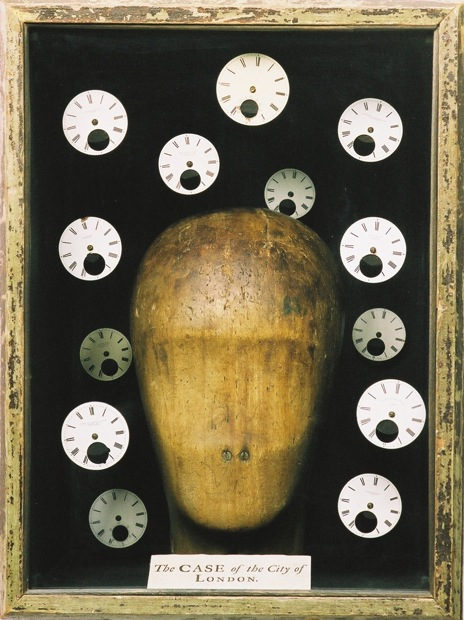
The Case of the City of London, 1894. 39.5 x 29.5 x 26 cm. MuseumZeitraum Leipzig.

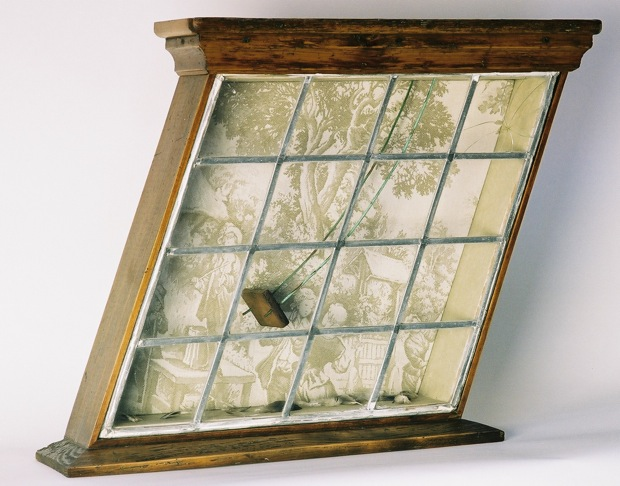
L'Hotel de Vie, 1886. 52 x 70 x 15.5 cm. MuseumZeitraum Leipzig.

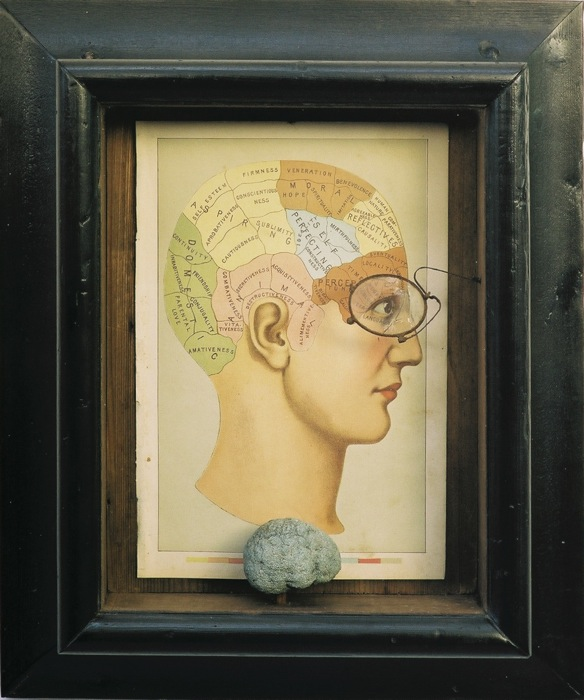
Phrenology of the Brain, 1895. 36 x 30.5 x 9 cm. MuseumZeitraum Leipzig.

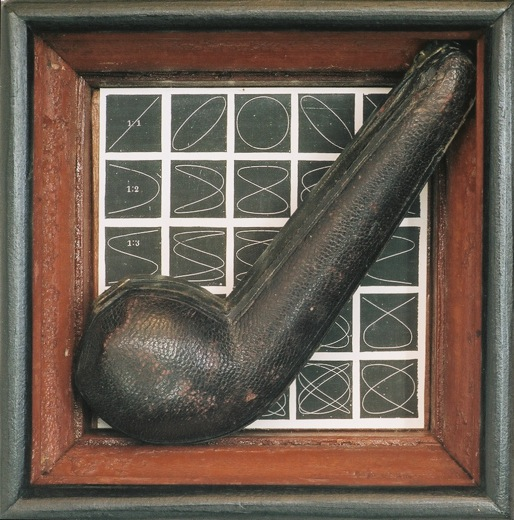
Harmonisch, 1895. 14.5 x 14.5 x 7 cm. MuseumZeitraum Leipzig.

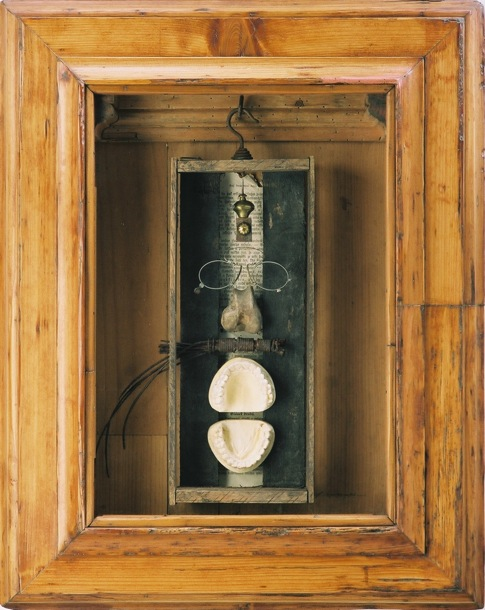
Prince Otto von Bismarck, 1896. 66 x 53 x 13 cm. MuseumZeitraum Leipzig.

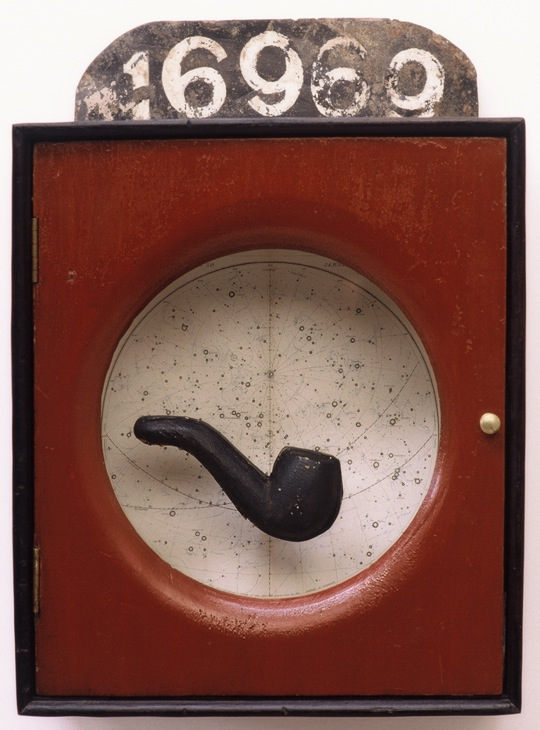
16969, 1896. 38 x 28 x 10 cm. MuseumZeitraum Leipzig.

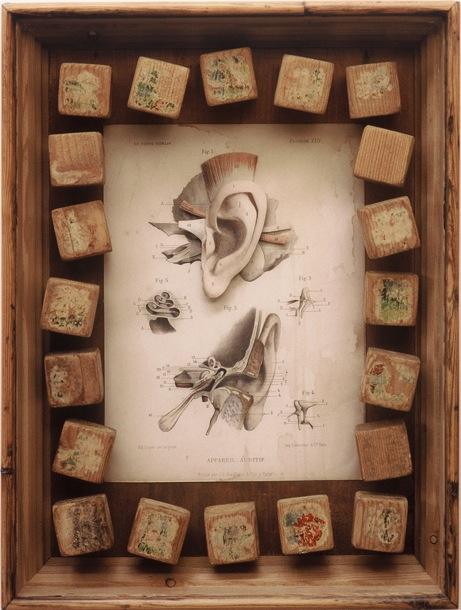
Appareil Auditif, 1896. 46 x 35 x 10 cm. MuseumZeitraum Leipzig.

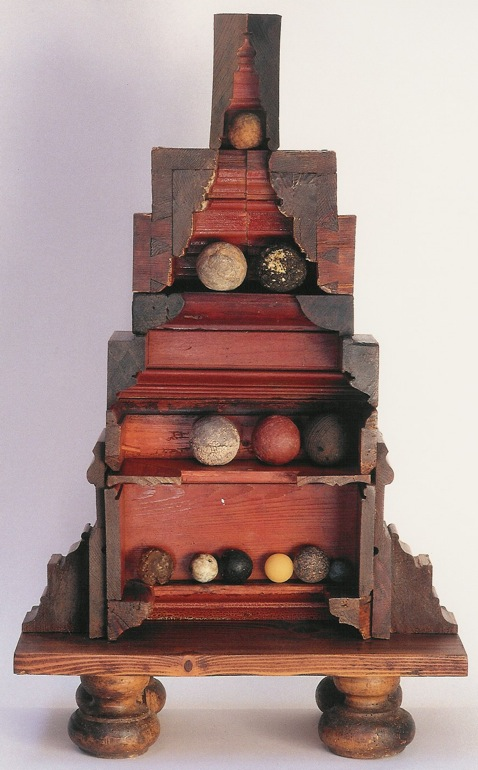
L'Hotel des Spheres, 1896. 80 x 49 x 24 cm. MuseumZeitraum Leipzig.

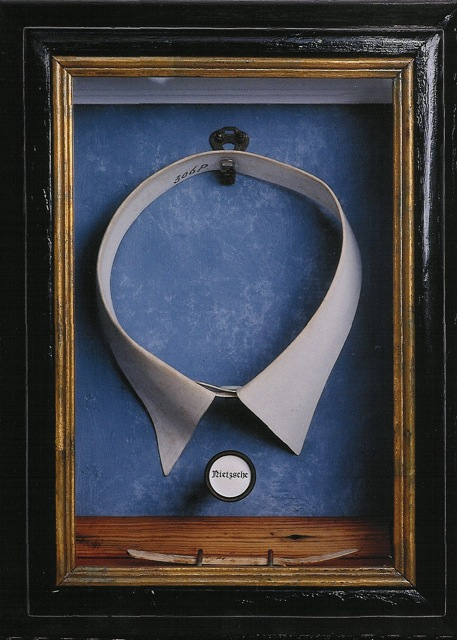
Nietzsche, 306P, 1897. 38 x 28 x 10 cm. MuseumZeitraum Leipzig.

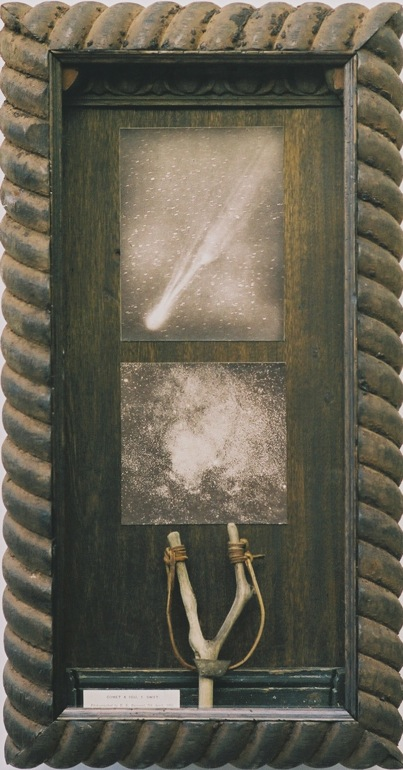
Dasein (Being), 1897. 48 x 26 x 7 cm. MuseumZeitraum Leipzig.

=== Later photography ===
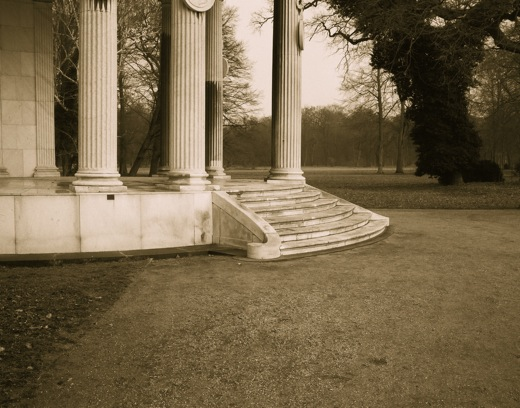
Freundschaftstempel, Potsdam, 1896. Albumen silver print, 18 x 23 cm. The Wassmann Foundation, Washington, D.C.

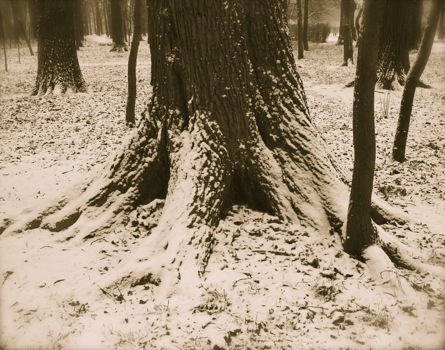
1000 Oaks, 1897. Albumen silver print, 18 x 23 cm. The Wassmann Foundation, Washington, D.C.

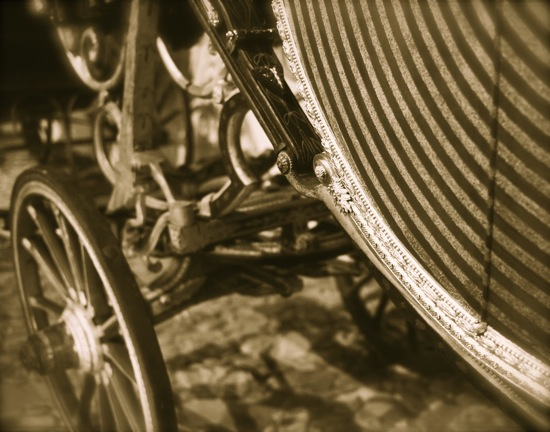
Berlin, 1897. Albumen silver print, 18 x 23 cm. The Wassmann Foundation, Washington, D.C.

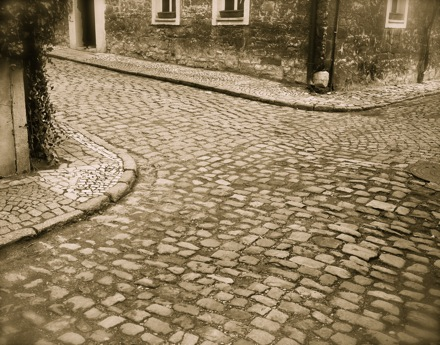
Freyburg, 1897. Albumen silver print, 18 x 23 cm. The Wassmann Foundation, Washington, D.C.

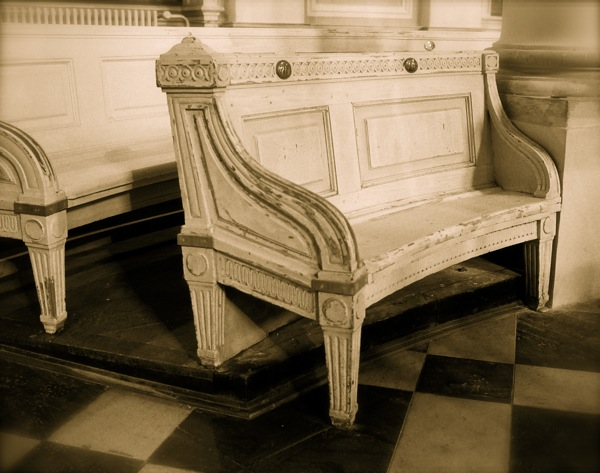
Nikolaikirche, Leipzig, 1894. Albumen silver print, 18 x 23 cm. The Wassmann Foundation, Washington, D.C.

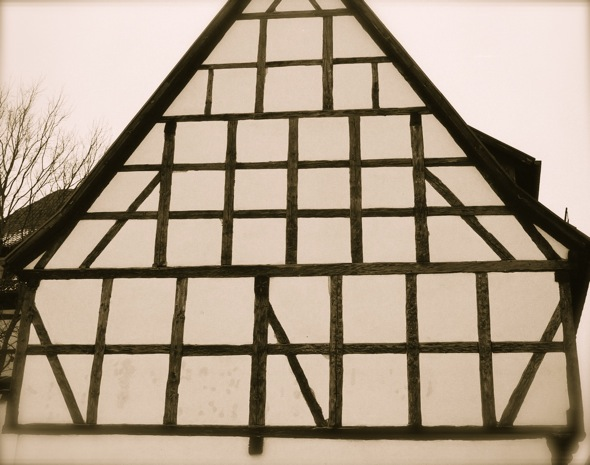
Quedlinburg, 1897. Albumen silver print, 18 x 23 cm. The Wassmann Foundation, Washington, D.C.

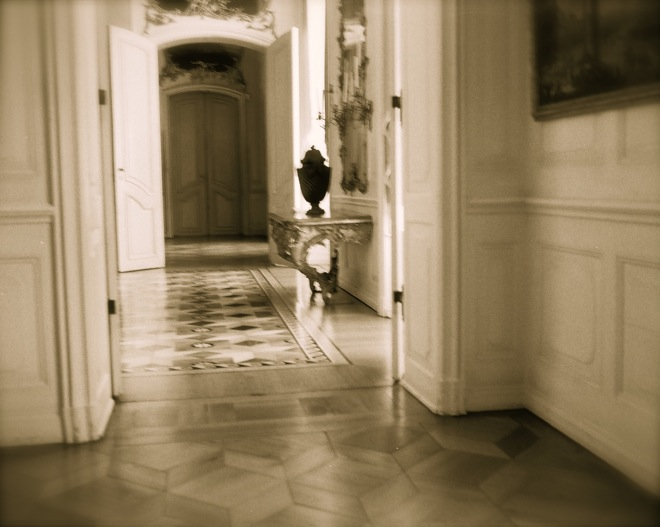
Schloss Sanssouci, Potsdam, 1896. Albumen silver print, 18 x 23 cm. The Wassmann Foundation, Washington, D.C.

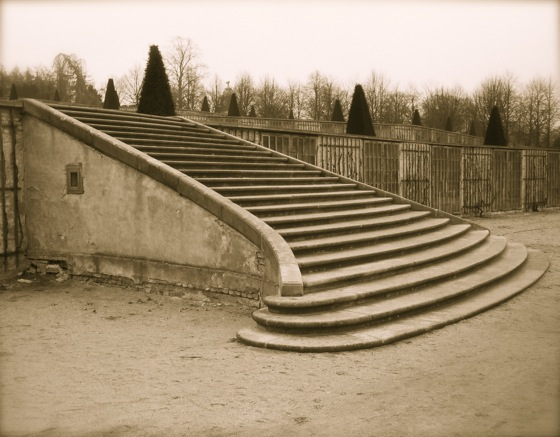
Weinbergterrassen, Park Sanssouci, Potsdam, 1897. Albumen silver print, 18 x 23 cm. The Wassmann Foundation, Washington, D.C.

=== Ephemera ===
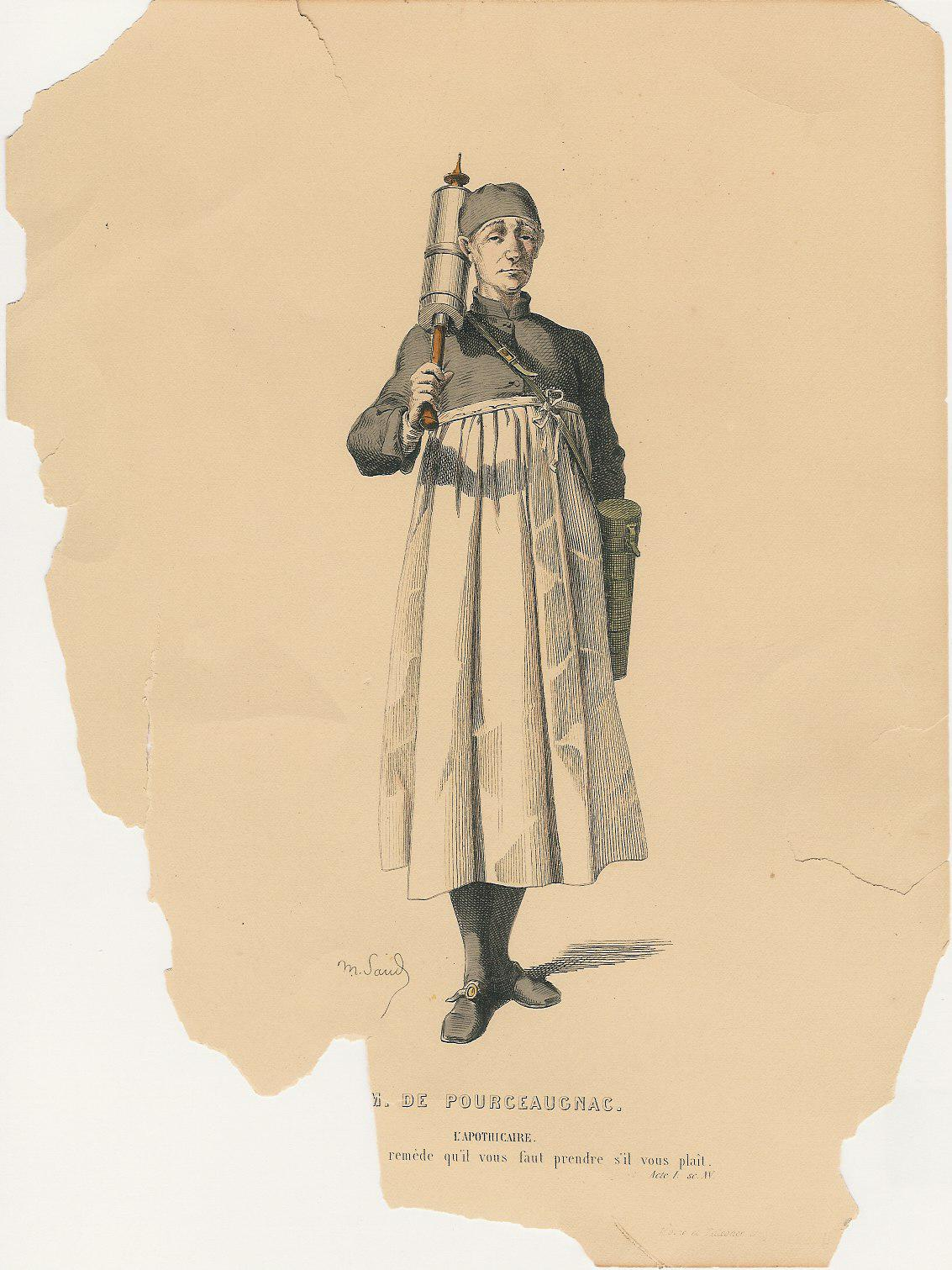
Worn apothecare print. French, 1870s. MuseumZeitraum Leipzig.

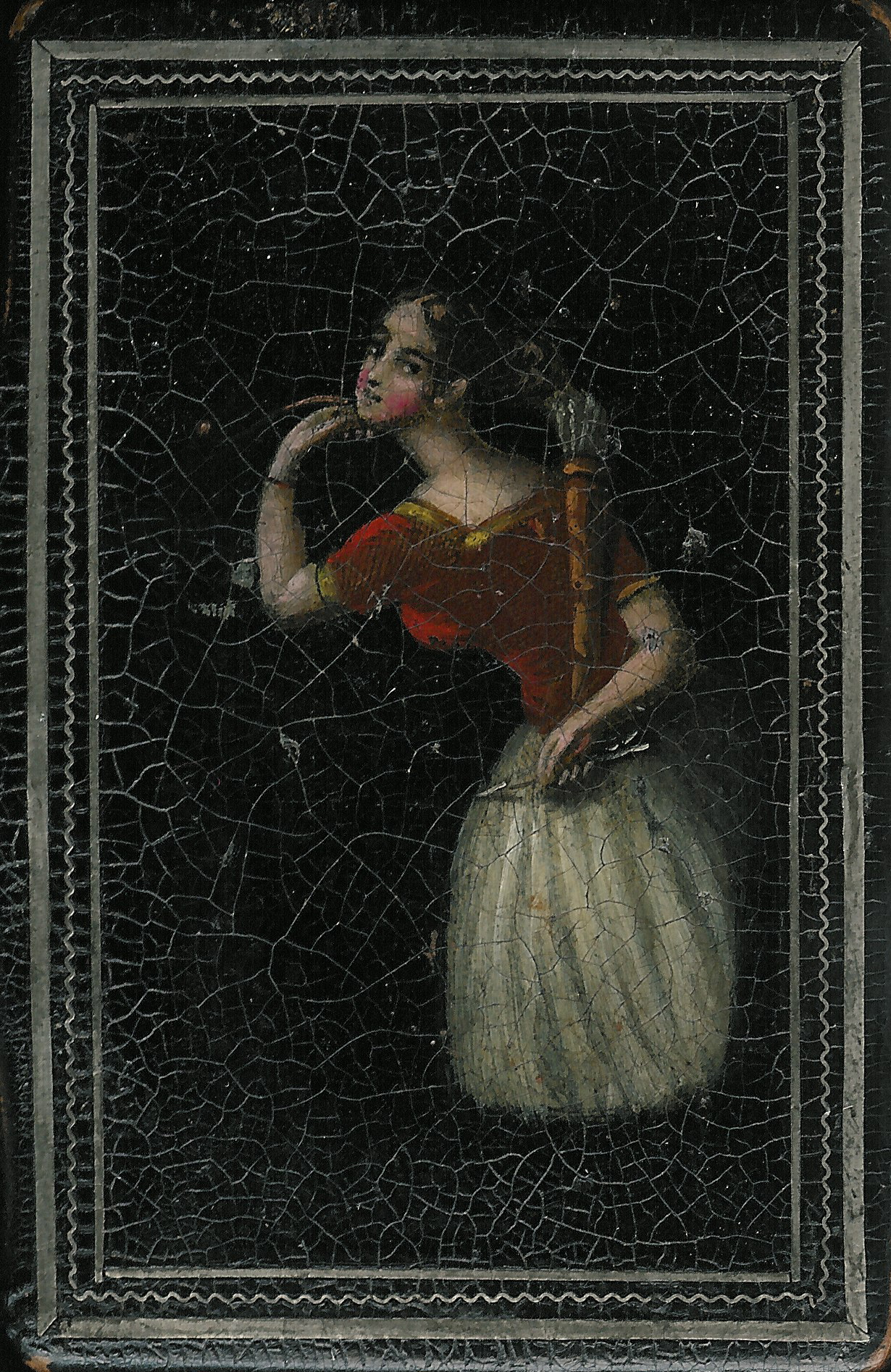
Biedermeier snuff box. German, 1840s. MuseumZeitraum Leipzig.

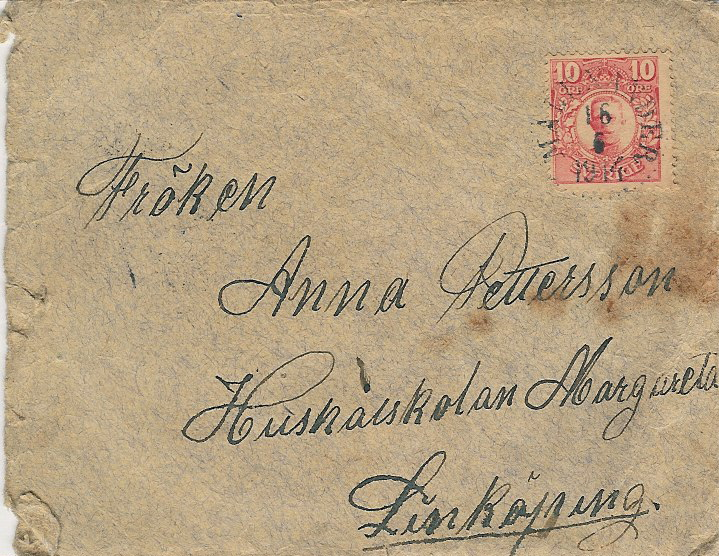
Envelope to Anna Peterson. Swedish, 1890s. MuseumZeitraum Leipzig.

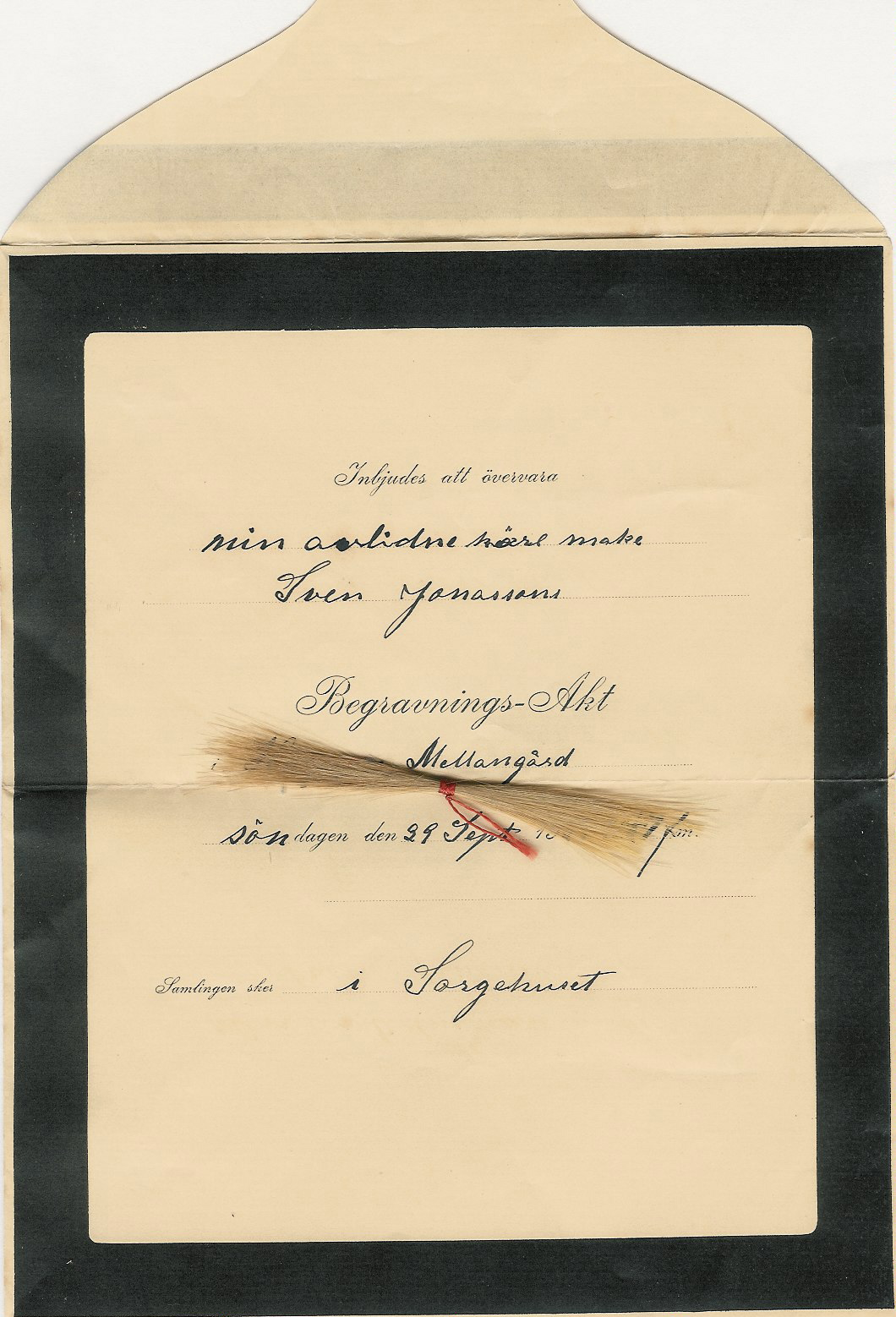
Family death notice. Swedish, 1890s. MuseumZeitraum Leipzig.
