= A Large Attendance in the Antechamber =

A Large Attendance In The Antechamber
- Original language: English
- Written by: Brian Lipson
- Genre: Comedy

Premiere
- Date: 2000
- Place: Australia

A Large Attendance In The Antechamber is a one-man play by Brian Lipson about Francis Galton the English scientist, statistician and founder of the eugenics movement.

The play was first seen in Melbourne in 2000, and has since been performed in the UK, United States and New Zealand, both in theatres and in private homes.

== Plot summary ==
The play is both a philosophic discussion and a comedy, with most of the action occurring in one room in the center of the stage. Occasionally, the actor climbs out of the room and involves audience members in the performance. As the play continues, the line between the actor and the person he portrays (Brian Lipson and Francis Galton, respectively) becomes blurred, until finally the single man is both.

== Reviews ==
- Sydney Morning Herald Review
- Theatre Notes Review
